= Dąbrówka =

Dąbrówka may refer to:

- Dąbrówka, Brodnica County in Kuyavian-Pomeranian Voivodeship (north-central Poland)
- Czarna Dąbrówka, a village in Pomeranian Voivodeship (north Poland)
- Dąbrówka Bytowska railway station, former railway station
- Dąbrówka Kościelna, Greater Poland Voivodeship (west-central Poland)
- Dąbrówka Mała, a district of Katowice, Poland
- Dąbrówka, Lipno County in Kuyavian-Pomeranian Voivodeship (north-central Poland)
- Dąbrówka, Radziejów County in Kuyavian-Pomeranian Voivodeship (central Poland)
- Dąbrówka, Świecie County in Kuyavian-Pomeranian Voivodeship (north-central Poland)
- Dąbrówka, Tuchola County in Kuyavian-Pomeranian Voivodeship (north-central Poland)
- Dąbrówka, Wąbrzeźno County in Kuyavian-Pomeranian Voivodeship (north-central Poland)
- Dąbrówka, Gmina Kowal in Kuyavian-Pomeranian Voivodeship (central Poland)
- Dąbrówka, Gmina Lubanie in Kuyavian-Pomeranian Voivodeship (central Poland)
- Dąbrówka, Sępólno County in Kuyavian-Pomeranian Voivodeship (north-central Poland)
- Dąbrówka, Mogilno County in Kuyavian-Pomeranian Voivodeship (central Poland)
- Dąbrówka, Biłgoraj County in Lublin Voivodeship (east Poland)
- Dąbrówka, Janów County in Lublin Voivodeship (east Poland)
- Dąbrówka, Lubartów County in Lublin Voivodeship (east Poland)
- Dąbrówka, Gmina Sokółka in Podlaskie Voivodeship (north-east Poland)
- Dąbrówka, Gmina Janów in Podlaskie Voivodeship (north-east Poland)
- Dąbrówka, Bytów County in Pomeranian Voivodeship (north Poland)
- Dąbrówka, Łask County in Łódź Voivodeship (central Poland)
- Dąbrówka, Łódź East County in Łódź Voivodeship (central Poland)
- Dąbrówka, Gmina Drzewica in Łódź Voivodeship (central Poland)
- Dąbrówka, Gmina Sławno in Łódź Voivodeship (central Poland)
- Dąbrówka, Pajęczno County in Łódź Voivodeship (central Poland)
- Dąbrówka, Gmina Aleksandrów in Łódź Voivodeship (central Poland)
- Dąbrówka, Gmina Moszczenica in Łódź Voivodeship (central Poland)
- Dąbrówka, Gmina Wola Krzysztoporska in Łódź Voivodeship (central Poland)
- Dąbrówka, Poddębice County in Łódź Voivodeship (central Poland)
- Dąbrówka, Radomsko County in Łódź Voivodeship (central Poland)
- Dąbrówka, Gmina Sieradz in Łódź Voivodeship (central Poland)
- Dąbrówka, Gmina Wróblew in Łódź Voivodeship (central Poland)
- Dąbrówka, Gmina Czerniewice, Tomaszów County in Łódź Voivodeship (central Poland)
- Dąbrówka, Wieruszów County in Łódź Voivodeship (central Poland)
- Dąbrówka, Łuków County in Lublin Voivodeship (east Poland)
- Dąbrówka, Bochnia County in Lesser Poland Voivodeship (south Poland)
- Dąbrówka, Wadowice County in Lesser Poland Voivodeship (south Poland)
- Dąbrówka, Jasło County in Subcarpathian Voivodeship (south-east Poland)
- Dąbrówka, Lubaczów County in Subcarpathian Voivodeship (south-east Poland)
- Dąbrówka, Nisko County in Subcarpathian Voivodeship (south-east Poland)
- Dąbrówka, Opatów County in Świętokrzyskie Voivodeship (south-central Poland)
- Dąbrówka, Gmina Krasocin in Świętokrzyskie Voivodeship (south-central Poland)
- Dąbrówka, Gmina Moskorzew in Świętokrzyskie Voivodeship (south-central Poland)
- Dąbrówka, Białobrzegi County in Masovian Voivodeship (east-central Poland)
- Dąbrówka, Gostynin County in Masovian Voivodeship (central Poland)
- Dąbrówka, Grójec County in Masovian Voivodeship (east-central Poland)
- Dąbrówka, Gmina Lipsko in Masovian Voivodeship (east-central Poland)
- Dąbrówka, Gmina Sienno in Masovian Voivodeship (east-central Poland)
- Dąbrówka, Gmina Czerwonka in Masovian Voivodeship (east-central Poland)
- Dąbrówka, Gmina Różan in Masovian Voivodeship (east-central Poland)
- Dąbrówka, Gmina Rzewnie in Masovian Voivodeship (east-central Poland)
- Dąbrówka, Mińsk County in Masovian Voivodeship (east-central Poland)
- Dąbrówka, Ostrołęka County in Masovian Voivodeship (north-east Poland)
- Dąbrówka, Otwock County in Masovian Voivodeship (east-central Poland)
- Dąbrówka, Sokołów County in Masovian Voivodeship (east-central Poland)
- Dąbrówka, Warsaw, a neighbourhood in Warsaw, Masovian Voivodeship (east-central Poland)
- Dąbrówka, Wołomin County in Masovian Voivodeship (east-central Poland)
- Dąbrówka, Gmina Czosnów, Nowy Dwór County in Masovian Voivodeship (east-central Poland)
- Dąbrówka, Gostyń County in Greater Poland Voivodeship (west-central Poland)
- Dąbrówka, Koło County in Greater Poland Voivodeship (central Poland)
- Dąbrówka, Międzychód County in Greater Poland Voivodeship (west-central Poland)
- Dąbrówka, Poznań County in Greater Poland Voivodeship (west-central Poland)
- Dąbrówka, Rawicz County in Greater Poland Voivodeship (west-central Poland)
- Dąbrówka, Gliwice County in Silesian Voivodeship (south Poland)
- Dąbrówka, Kłobuck County in Silesian Voivodeship (south Poland)
- Dąbrówka, Lubusz Voivodeship (west Poland)
- Dąbrówka, Opole Voivodeship (south Poland)
- Dąbrówka, Chojnice County in Pomeranian Voivodeship (north Poland)
- Dąbrówka, Gmina Dziemiany in Pomeranian Voivodeship (north Poland)
- Dąbrówka, Gmina Kościerzyna in Pomeranian Voivodeship (north Poland)
- Dąbrówka, Słupsk County in Pomeranian Voivodeship (north Poland)
- Dąbrówka, Starogard County in Pomeranian Voivodeship (north Poland)
- Dąbrówka, Tczew County in Pomeranian Voivodeship (north Poland)
- Dąbrówka, Gmina Gniewino in Pomeranian Voivodeship (north Poland)
- Dąbrówka, Gmina Luzino in Pomeranian Voivodeship (north Poland)
- Dąbrówka, Iława County in Warmian-Masurian Voivodeship (north Poland)
- Dąbrówka, Lidzbark County in Warmian-Masurian Voivodeship (north Poland)
- Dąbrówka, Olsztyn County in Warmian-Masurian Voivodeship (north Poland)
- Dąbrówka, Pisz County in Warmian-Masurian Voivodeship (north-east Poland)
- Dąbrówka, Węgorzewo County in Warmian-Masurian Voivodeship (north Poland)
- Dąbrówka, Szczecinek County in West Pomeranian Voivodeship (north-west Poland)
- Dąbrówka, Świdwin County in West Pomeranian Voivodeship (north-west Poland)

== See also ==
- Dąbrówka of Poland, Doubravka of Bohemia, a Bohemian princess member of the Přemyslid dynasty and by marriage Duchess of the Polans
- Dubravka (disambiguation)
- Doubravka
