= Transport in Upper Silesia =

Transport network in Upper Silesia

Upper Silesia has an extensive and developed transport network which includes both public and private services. As of 2020, Upper Silesia's transport modal share by journey was 40% public transport, 10% on foot, 4% by bicycle and 2% by train.

The transit authority of the metropolis, Zarząd Transportu Metropolitalnego (ZTM), operates the region's public transport. Upper Silesia (also known as GZM) consists of commuter and long-distance trains, trams, buses and city bikes. The main network is focused around its capital, Katowice; and surrounding towns and cities; Zabrze, Bytom, Tarnowskie Góry, Sosnowiec, Ruda Slaska and more.

== Public transport ==
=== Tram and bus lines ===
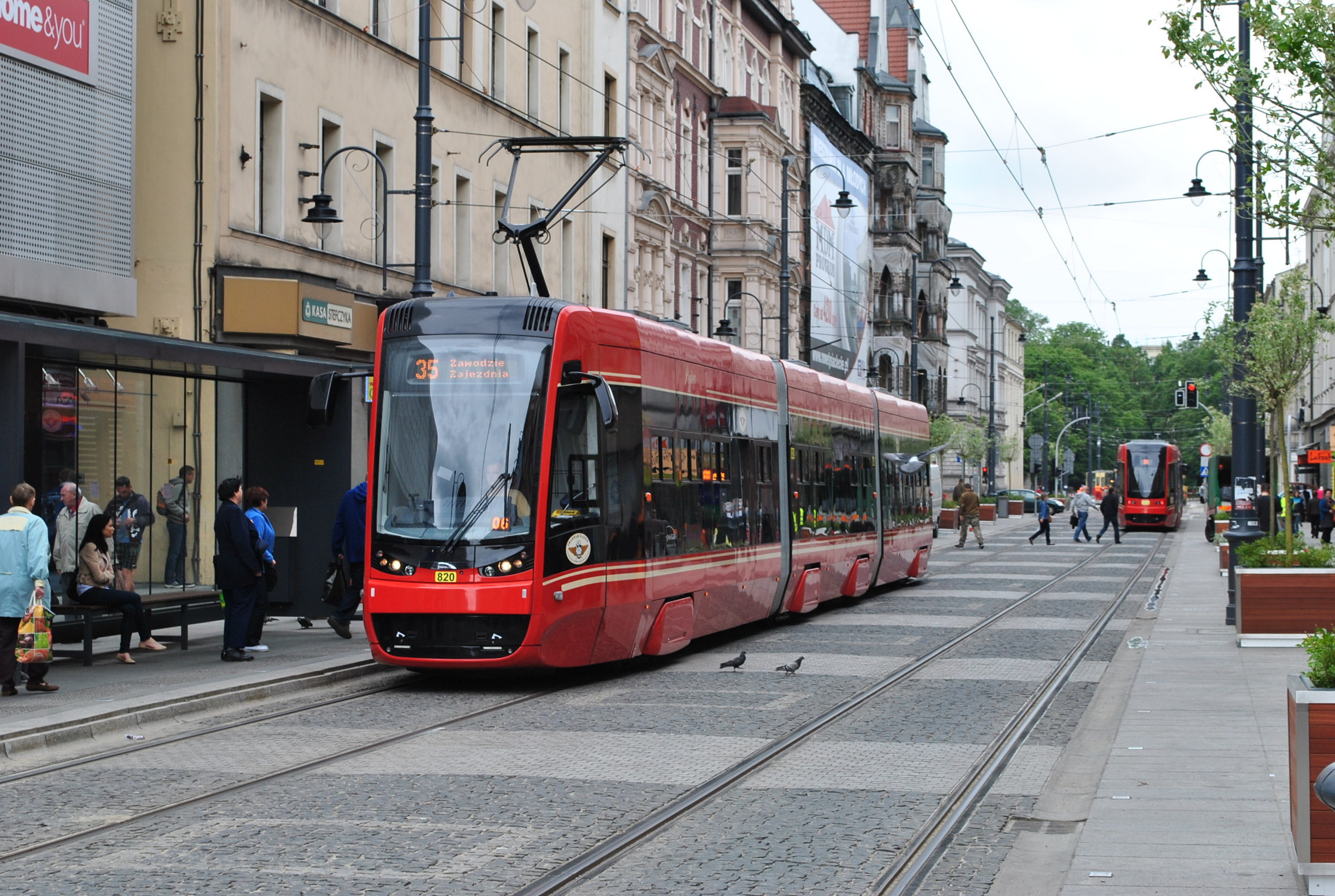
Pesa Twist tram in Katowice

The Silesian Interurban tram system is one of the largest and oldest in Europe, in operation since 1894 and covering over 200 km (124 mi) of rails, including 62 km (39 mi) in Katowice proper. The network in Katowice is mostly located in the northern part of the city has a star-like shape, with most lines converging on the Rynek square and expanding to all directions. There are 13 tram lines in Katowice, all but 2 expanding into neighboring cities. 116 tram stops are located in Katowice proper, as of 2020. A new tram line is planned to the southern suburbs since 2016.

In addition to trams, bus lines are organized by ZTM. There are currently 63 regular lines in Katowice (including night lines), and additional 10 express metropolitan lines, with 609 bus stops as of 2020. ZTM organizes a bus line to their airport as well, which runs every 30 minutes between 4am and 9:30pm and every hour at night.

== Rail ==
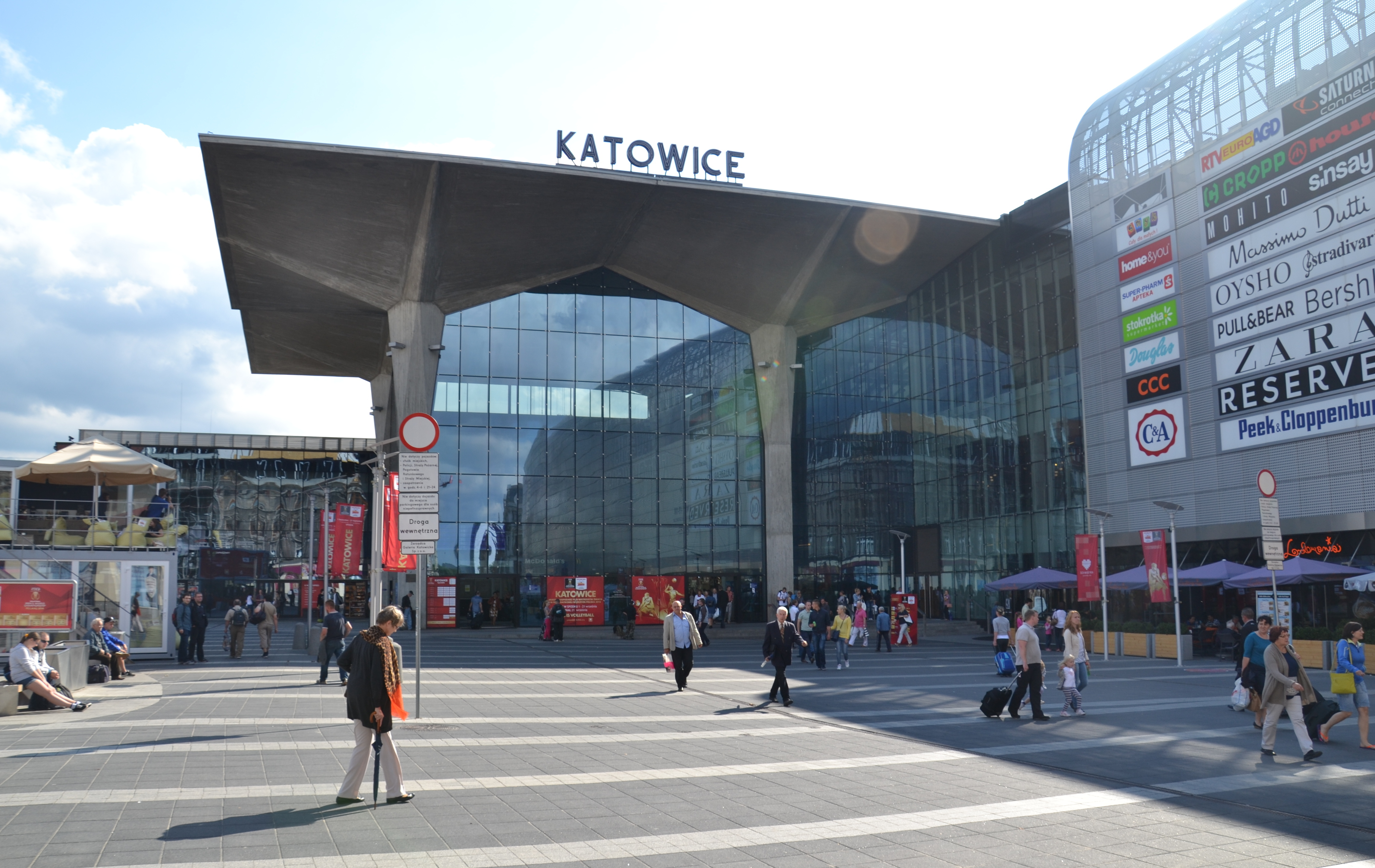
Katowice railway station

Katowice is the main railway hub in southern Poland. Katowice's main railway station is the fifth-busiest train station in Poland as of 2019 (and third outside Warsaw), with 17.6 million passengers and growing 47 percent since 2015. 16% of the passengers travelled on PKP Intercity train, the main long-distance train operator in Poland.

Katowice has a direct Express Intercity Premium (high-speed) connection to Warsaw through the Centralna Magistrala Kolejowa, with a run time of 2 hours 21 minutes. PKP Intercity also offers direct standard connections to Kraków (under 1 hour), Wrocław, Kielce and Ostrava (under 2 hours), Warsaw, Rzeszów, Olomouc, and Łódź (under 3 hours), Poznań (under 4 hours), Brno, Vienna and Bratislava (under 5 hours), as well as Prague, Budapest, and Berlin.

=== Commuter rail ===
Silesian Railways (Koleje Śląskie), a regional railway authority, connects Katowice with its suburbs and other major cities in Silesian and Lesser Poland voivodeships: Gliwice, Rybnik, Częstochowa, Bielsko-Biała, Kraków, and Oświęcim, among others. It operates 9 regular lines and 1 tourist weekend line (to Zakopane). Polregio operates commuter trains from Katowice to cities and towns in Lesser Poland and Świętokrzyskie voivodeships: Trzebinia, Olkusz, and Kielce, among others.

== Road ==
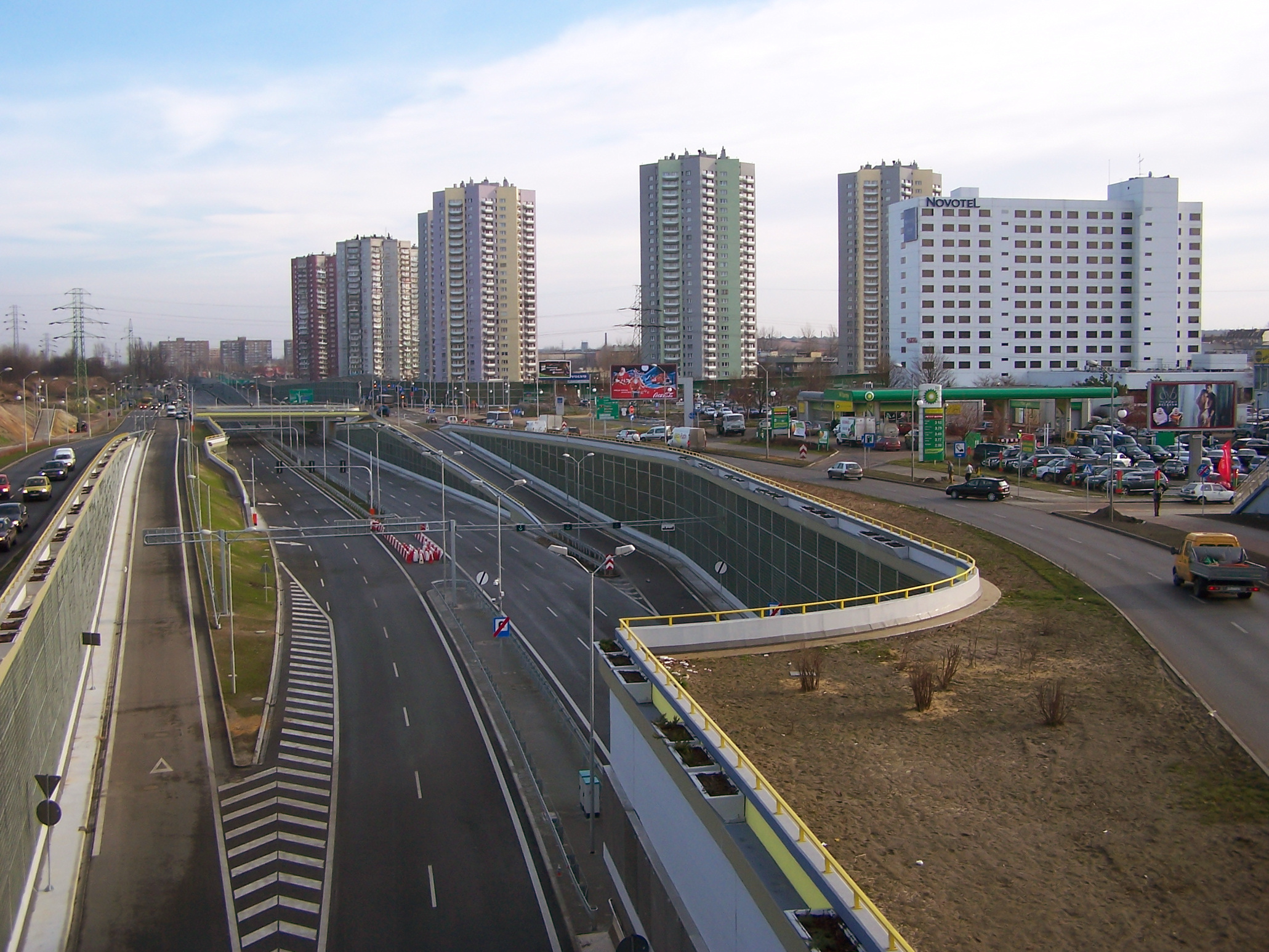
Drogowa Trasa Średnicowa (DK79) exiting the tunnel below Katowice city center

Katowice has an extensive network of freeways, roads and streets, totaling over 1,120 km (696 mi) in length. The well-developed network supports over 200,000 cars registered in Katowice, and 49 percent of commuters that drive alone, a high share compared to other major cities in Poland. Several freeways in Katowice are among the busiest in Poland: expressway S86 between Sosnowiec and Katowice's city center and highway A4 between Murckowska and Mikołowska interchanges both see over 100,000 cars passing each day.

Katowice has a ring around its city center, consisting of highway A4, Murckowska freeway, Drogowa Trasa Średnicowa (a freeway-style road connecting downtowns of cities in the Katowice urban area) that partly goes in a tunnel underground and Bocheńskiego road. Many of the roads and freeways in Katowice expand radially from the city center and replaced old local roads.

European route E40 passes through Katowice as highway A4. It enters the city from Chorzów and continues eastward, with three lanes in each direction on the main road and two to three lanes in parallel access roads. It meets Bocheńskiego road and continues towards Mikołowska interchange, which is one of the only combination interchanges in Poland and the main exit towards the city center. After that interchange, the highway loses its access roads due to lack of space in the dense urban area and continues east with four lanes in each direction. Access roads appear again (only on the south side, though) after around 500 meters and there is an exit towards Francuska Street. After another 1.5 kilometer, access roads appear again on the north side, too, and there is a tight exit towards Pułaskiego Street. The highway then runs into Murckowska interchange, before exiting the city.

=== National roads ===
National road 79 (DK79) enters Katowice from Chorzów and separates the Silesian Park and Osiedle Tysiąclecia in Katowice. It then merges with Drogowa Trasa Średnicowa (DTŚ) at the junction with Bocheńskiego road and Złota Street. It continues with DTŚ through the Katowice city center and descents into a tunnel under the Rondo roundabout. It then emerges overground again, right before an interchange with DK86. The road continues eastward as a freeway with exits towards Zawodzie and Szopienice neighborhoods for several more kilometers, before entering Mysłowice and becoming a standard-access road.

National road 81 (DK81) enters Katowice from Mikołów and runs through the southern residential neighborhoods as an arterial road with two lanes in each direction, named Kościuszki Street. In the Brynów neighborhood, Kościuszki Street continues towards Katowice's city center while NR 81 turns east, to run through the forest towards the interchange with DK86.

National road 86 (DK86) enters Katowice from Sosnowiec as expressway S86 up until Roździeńskiego interchange where it meets DK79 and loses its expressway status. It then continues south as Murckowska freeway east of the city center. It meets highway A4 and then passes by Giszowiec neighborhood and continues through the woods southward, with exits towards Murcki neighborhood (from which it gets its name) and Kostuchna. It bypasses Murcki from the east and continues south towards Tychy.

=== Tempo 30 Zone ===
In 2015, Katowice designated most of its city center as a 30 km/h (19 miles per hour) zone, in an effort to curb traffic fatalities and crashes. Within 3 years of operation, the number of accidents dropped by 41 percent, including 37 percent drop in accidents involving pedestrians and cyclists. The accidents are also less severe: there was a 55 percent drop in injured pedestrians and cyclists.

== Air ==
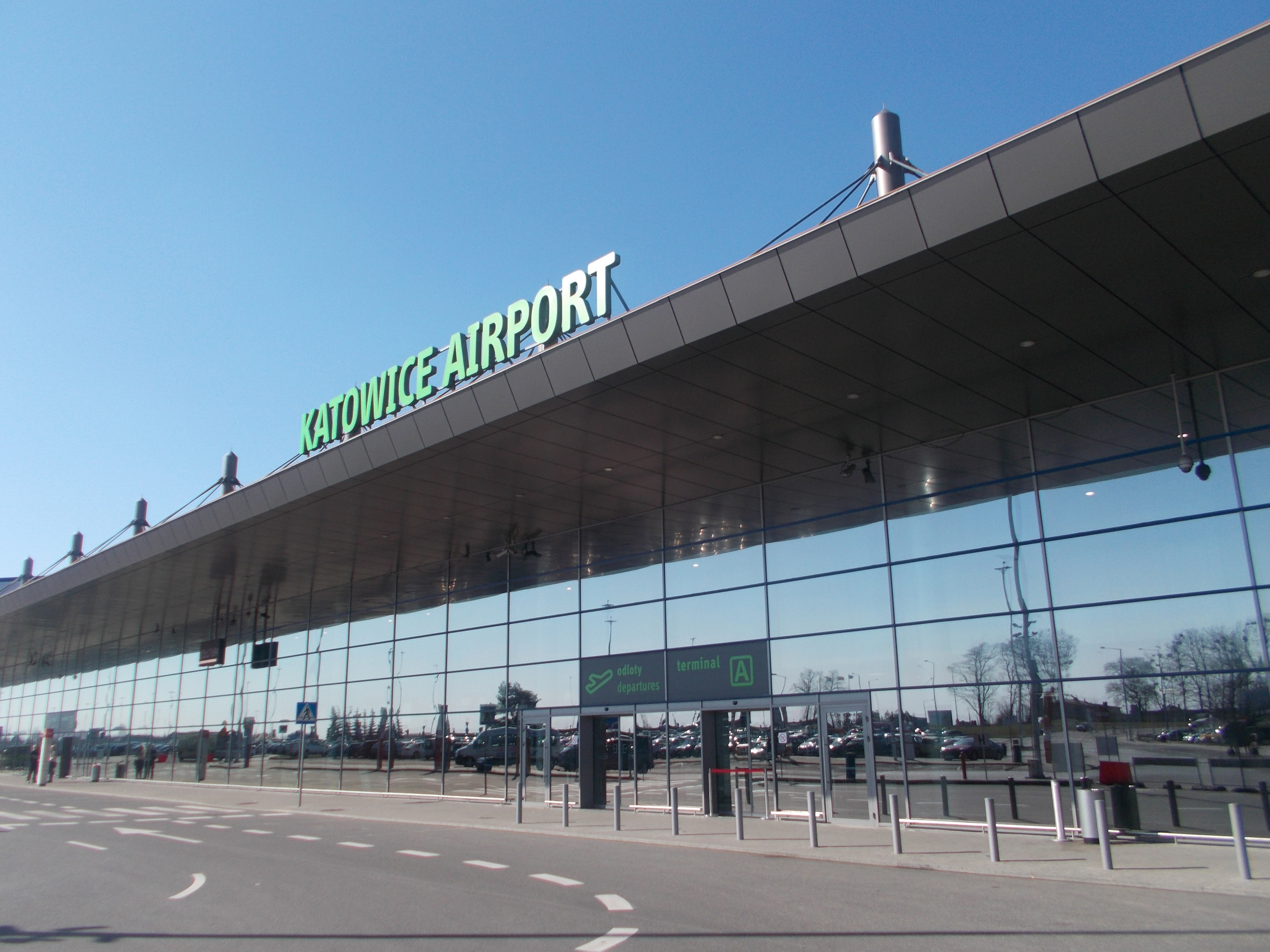
Katowice Airport

Located approximately 30 km (19 mi) north of the city center, Katowice Airport is the main airport serving Katowice. The airport is a focus city for LOT Polish Airlines, Ryanair and its subsidiary Buzz, Wizz Air, Smartwings, and Enter Air. The busiest routes are: London, Dortmund, Antalya, Eindhoven, Warsaw and Frankfurt. Katowice is the largest leisure travel airport in Poland. Long-haul flights are operated from Katowice to Varadero in Cuba, Bangkok in Thailand, Cancún in Mexico, Malé in Maldives and to Puerto Plata as well as Punta Cana in Dominican Republic. Katowice is also the second-largest cargo airport, after Warsaw Chopin. The airport is accessed through a metropolitan express bus line, running every 30 minutes between 4am and 9:30pm and every hour at night. A new train station at the airport is under construction, scheduled to be operational in 2023.

Katowice is also within an hour drive from Kraków Airport, which offers additional destinations and airlines such as Amsterdam (KLM), Paris (Air France), Helsinki (Finnair), Chicago and Newark (LOT Polish Airlines), Copenhagen and Stockholm (SAS) and Zurich (Swiss). The airport can be accessed through scheduled buses leaving from Katowice bus station every 30–60 minutes.

== Other modes ==
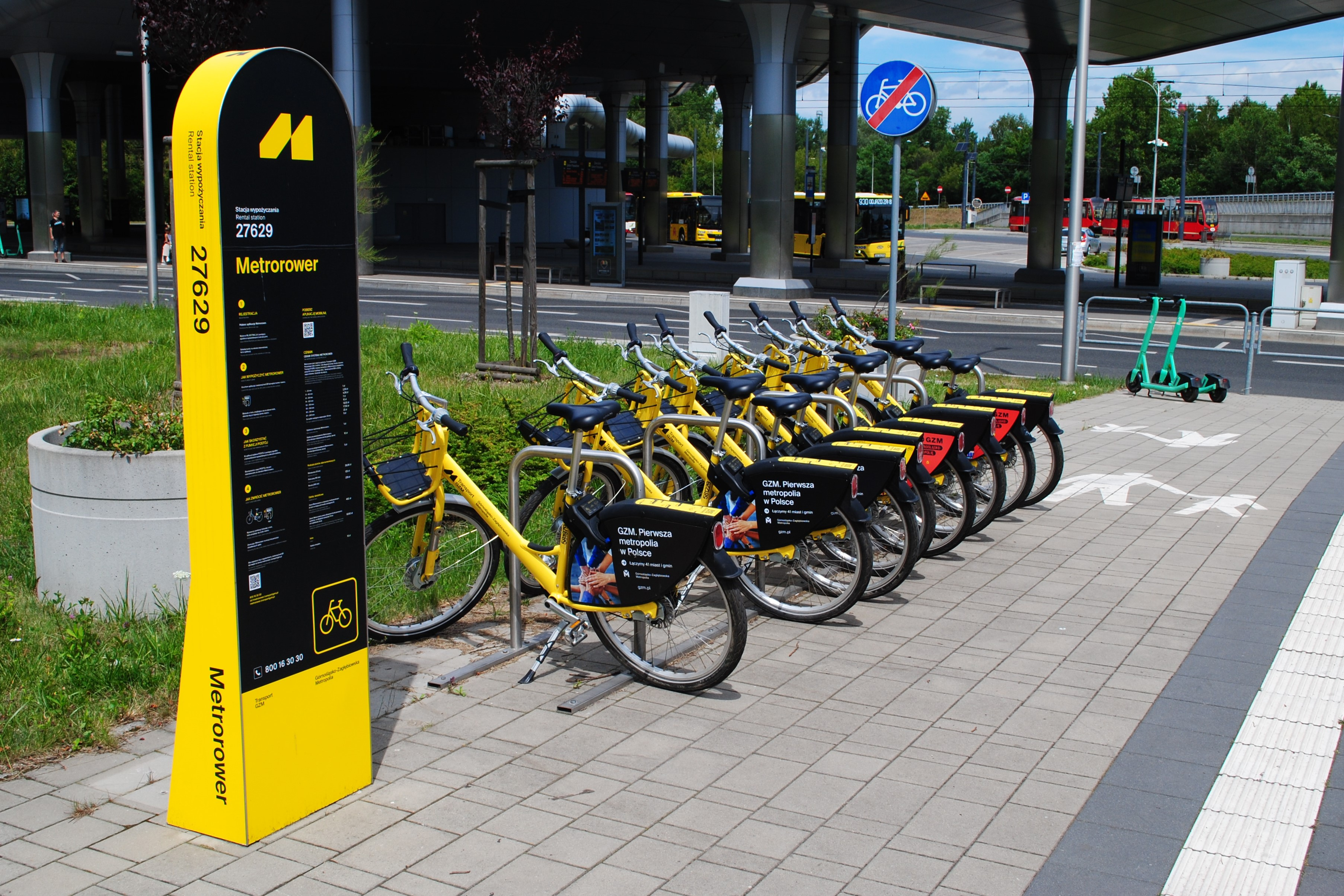
Metrobike bicycles in Zawodzie district

Cycling is becoming a more popular mode of transportation in Katowice. As of 2021, the city had 92.6 km (57.5 mi) of dedicated bicycle lanes, up from 60 km (37 miles) in 2015. The metropolitan bicycle system is operated by Nextbike and has 924 stations with over 7000 bicycles in Katowice and in surrounding cities. Rides under 30 minutes costs PLN 1, less than 1 hour costs PLN 2.50 and each additional hour becomes more expensive.

Katowice has a modern international bus station located close to the city center. There are over 400 connections on a typical weekday, with the most-popular ones being domestic destinations in Poland and cities in Ukraine.

Bolt and Blinkee operate commercial systems of scooter share. Traficar and Panek Car Share operate commercial carshare systems. There are also three park-and-ride centers in Katowice with over 1,000 parking spaces.
