= Radzice =

Radzice is part of the name of two villages, both located in Gmina Drzewica, within Opoczno County, Łódź Voivodeship, Poland:

- Radzice Duże
- Radzice Male
