= Dubravka =

Dubravka or Dúbravka may refer to:

== Places ==
- Dúbravka, Bratislava, a district of Bratislava, Slovakia
- Dubravka, Croatia, a village in Konavle, Croatia
- Dúbravka, Michalovce, a village in the Michalovce District, Slovakia

== Other ==
- Dubravka (drama), a 17th-century pastoral play by Ivan Gundulić
- Dubravka, a pastorale for choir and orchestra, composed by Jakov Gotovac
- HSC Dubravka, a high speed passenger craft operated by Jadrolinija

== People with name Dubravka ==
=== Given name ===
- Dubravka Mijatović, Serbian actress
- Dubravka Šuica, Croatian politician
- Dubravka Tomšič Srebotnjak, Slovenian pianist and music teacher
- Dubravka Ugrešić, Croatian writer
- Dubravka Vukotić, Montenegrin actress
- Dubravka Zubović, opera singer from Croatia
- Dubravka Sekulić, Serbian author, architect and professor
- Dubravka Jusić, Croatian pop star and daughter of Đelo Jusić

=== Surname ===
- Martin Dúbravka, Slovak football goalkeeper

== See also ==
- Dubravko, masculine version
- Doubravka, a Czech variant
- Dúbravka (disambiguation), a Slovak variant
- Dąbrówka (disambiguation), a Polish variant
- Dubrava (disambiguation)
