= Krzczonów =

Krzczonów may refer to the following places in Poland:

- Krzczonów, Lower Silesian Voivodeship (south-west Poland)
- Krzczonów Landscape Park, a protected area in eastern Poland
- Krzczonów, Lublin Voivodeship (east Poland)
- Krzczonów, Łódź Voivodeship (central Poland)
- Krzczonów, Świętokrzyskie Voivodeship (south-central Poland)
- Krzczonów, Lesser Poland Voivodeship (south Poland)
