= Grodzisk Mazowiecki–Zawiercie railway =

Railway line in Poland

Centralna Magistrala Kolejowa
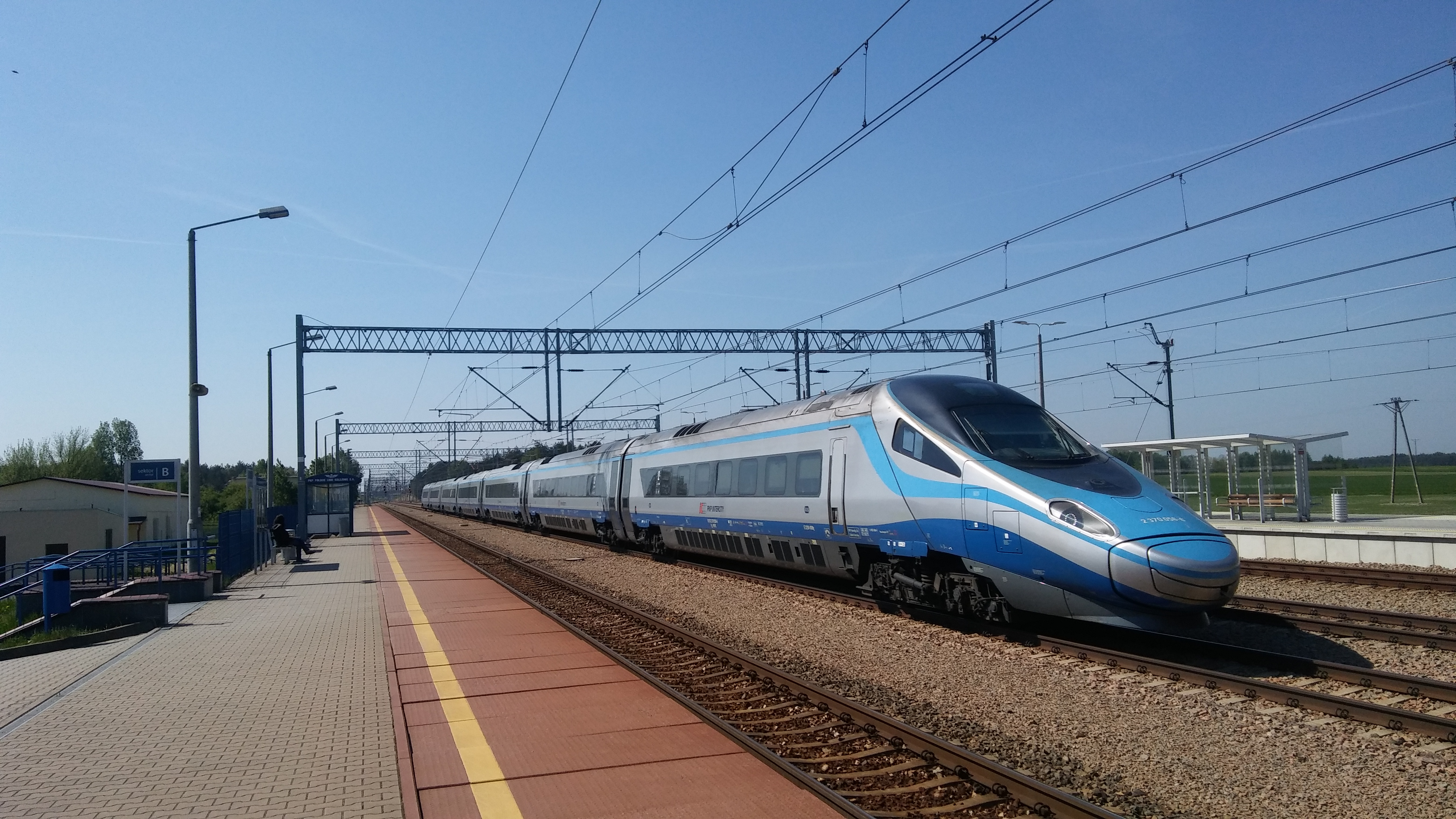
- Włoszczowa Północ Station

Overview
- Status: Operational
- Owner: Polish State Railways
- Locale: Grodzisk Mazowiecki, Opoczno, Włoszczowa, Zawiercie
- Termini: Grodzisk Mazowiecki railway station; Zawiercie
- Stations: 29

Service
- Type: Inter-city rail line
- System: InterCity and EuroCity
- Services: 1 main
- Operator: PKP Intercity
- Daily ridership: (est.)?

History
- Opened: 1977

Technical
- Line length: 224 km
- Character: 2 track main line
- Track gauge: 1,435 mm (4 ft 8 1/2 in)
- Electrification: 3 kV DC
- Operating speed: 200 km/h (125 mph); Planned: 250 km/h (155 mph)
Route map

The Grodzisk Mazowiecki–Zawiercie railway better known as the Central Rail Line (Polish: Centralna Magistrala Kolejowa, CMK), designated by Polish national railway infrastructure manager PKP Polskie Linie Kolejowe as rail line number 4 (Polish: linia kolejowa nr 4), is a 224 km (139 mi) long railway line in Poland between Zawiercie outside the Katowice urban area and Grodzisk Mazowiecki in the suburbs of Warsaw.

The line was originally built for freight transport, but now carries mostly InterCity and EuroCity long-distance passenger services from cities in the southern part of the country such as Katowice, Kraków, Wrocław, Opole and Częstochowa to Warsaw.

== History ==
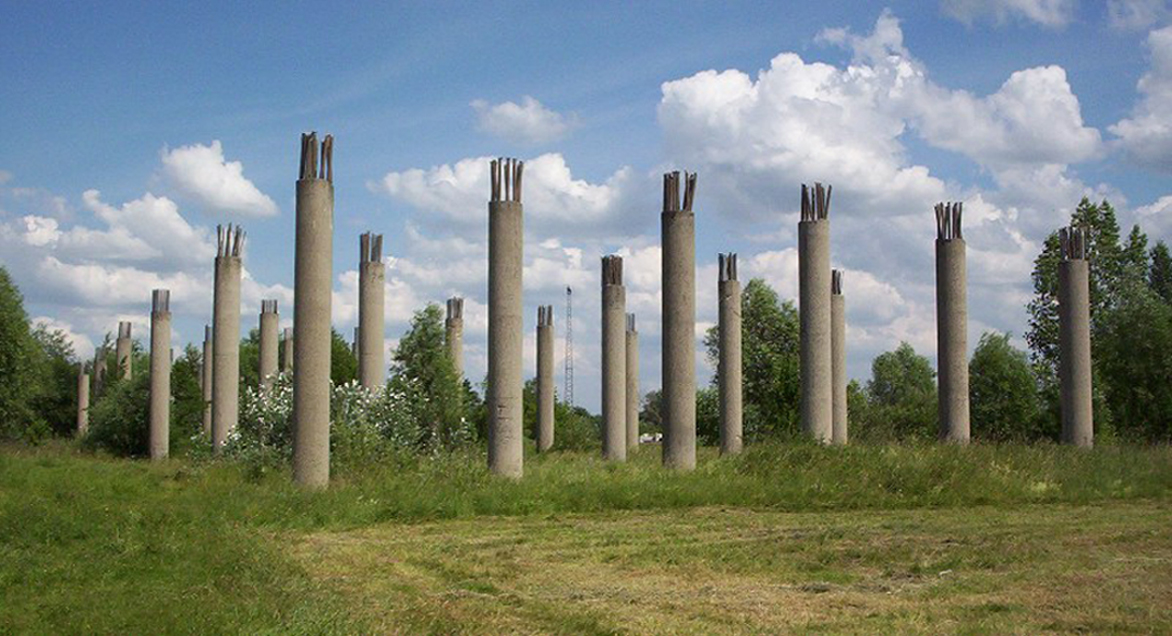
Unfinished bridge near Gmina Baranów (demolished in 2010), originally built in the 1970s as part of the planned "Olimpijka" motorway but never completed. Later proposed for reuse for the northern part of the CMK which also has never been built. Photo taken in July 2005.

The CMK was constructed between 1971 and 1977, as a freight line designed to haul coal from Upper Silesia and the Dąbrowa Basin to the ports of the Tricity. According to the original idea, it was supposed to start at Zawiercie, and end at Tczew or Gdańsk on the Baltic Sea coast. However, the economic crisis in mid-1970s Poland changed these plans, and the CMK ends at Grodzisk Mazowiecki, where it connected to the already-existing PKP line 1 formed from the former Warsaw–Vienna railway.

The idea of the construction of a direct rail connection between Upper Silesia and Warsaw was first proposed by professor Aleksander Wasiutyński in the 1920s. He rightly noted that the Warsaw–Vienna railway, which goes to Warsaw through Zawiercie, Myszków, Częstochowa, Radomsko, Piotrków Trybunalski, Koluszki, and Skierniewice, would not be able to carry all the passenger and freight traffic between the two industrial centers of the newly reestablished country. The idea was abandoned when the government constructed the Polish Coal Trunk-Line instead connecting Upper Silesia directly with the port of Gdynia, bypassing Warsaw.

In the late 1950s Polish planners again considered the concept, but came to the conclusion that electrification of the former Warsaw–Vienna railway should suffice for the increased traffic. The electrification was completed in 1957, increasing traffic volume by some 25%, but this was still not enough. In 1970 rail authorities briefly considered adding new tracks to existing lines, however, this idea was quickly abandoned and the idea of a new line was revived. The line was planned to be a two-track, high-speed connection, designed to carry both express passenger trains and heavy freight trains. Construction of several overpasses was planned, to avoid intersecting with roads. Speeds up to 250 km/h (155 mph) were projected for passenger trains, which would have made it the first high-speed rail line in Europe, and a maximum weight up to 5,000 gross tons for freight trains.

== Route ==
Polish engineers considered several options for the route of the new connection. They differed in several aspects - from the starting point (either at Zawiercie or Łazy), to a finishing point somewhere in the extensive Warsaw rail junction. According to the original design, the CMK would merge with PKP line 8 between Warsaw and Radom south of the Polish capital. This was rejected because of the inadequate infrastructure of the Warsaw - Radom line and the impossibility of extending the CMK further northwards. Another idea was that the CMK would merge with PKP line 1 near Piastów, but this would have been too costly because of the densely populated area. Finally, the route from Zawiercie to Grodzisk Mazowiecki was chosen.

The decision to begin construction of the 143 km (89 mi) Zawiercie - Radzice connection was taken in June 1971, and the first works began in August of that year. Some 30 companies participated in the construction, and the first trains ran on the still unfinished CMK on 26 September 1974, when a single track between Zawiercie and Idzikowice was opened, together with branches to Kraków (Starzyny - Psary), Kielce (Knapówka - Czarnca), Częstochowa (Włoszczowa Północna - Żelisławice), Łódż (Idzikowice - Dęba Opoczyńska), and Radom (Idzikowice - Radzice). The CMK was finally completed on 23 December 1977, when the 80 km (50 mi) connection Mszczonów - Grodzisk Mazowiecki was electrified. After completion of the track from Zawiercie to Grodzisk, construction of a Warsaw - Gdańsk Port Północny (via Wyszogród, Płock, Sierpc, Brodnica and Malbork) connection was planned, but abandoned in the late 1970s and early 1980, due to the ongoing financial crisis in Poland. Rail line number 5 remains reserved for the northward extension of the CMK.

== Service ==
For the first seven years, the CMK was used mostly for freight traffic. In 1980, the line carried 73 freight trains and only 4 passenger trains daily. This changed in the mid-1980s, when the government decided to open the line to more passenger trains. On 1 June 1984 the first express trains (Górnik, from Warszawa Wschodnia to Gliwice, and Krakus, from Warszawa Wschodnia to Kraków Główny) began traveling on the CMK, with speed of up to 140 km/h (87 mph), exceeding the previous record speeds of 130 km/h (81 mph) between Warsaw and Poznań on PKP line 3. Two years later the maximum speed was raised to 160 km/h (99 mph). On 11 May 1994, an Italian Pendolino FS Class ETR 460 train evaluated for purchase in Poland reached speed of 250.1 km/h (155.4 mph) for which the line was designed on a prepared section of the tracks near Biała Rawska, which remained the speed record for train travel in Central-Eastern Europe until November 2013. This single achievement, however, did not mean that trains began regular services with speeds of up to 250 km/h (155 mph). Before 2009 the Polish State Railways owned no rolling stock capable of such speeds, and numerous improvements in the infrastructure were required. The CMK line also lacked cab signalling required on high-speed rail lines, where trains travel at speeds making observation of lineside signals unreliable.

== Modernization after 2009 ==
Central Rail Line, green line shows max speed of 200 km/h

In June 2008 PKP ordered ten Siemens Eurosprinter ES64U4 Taurus electric locomotives designated as PKP class EU44 in Poland, capable of 200 km/h (124 mph), the first of which reached a speed of 235 km/h (146 mph) in a test on the CMK line on 28 May 2009. Delivery of the 10 locomotives was completed in June 2010. Despite their high speed capability these locomotives were initially assigned to conventional services operating at less than 160 km/h (99 mph).

On 29 August 2009 PKP signed a contract with Thales Rail Signaling to install European Train Control System (ETCS) Level 1 signaling on the CMK rail line, a modern signaling system which is being installed throughout the European Union particularly on high-speed rail lines. ETCS replaces lineside signals by data transmission to an on-board computer on the train, with signal aspects, speed restrictions, and a safe braking curve displayed on a monitor in front of the driver. Level 1 retains lineside signals for trains operating at less than 160 km/h (99 mph), while allowing ETCS equipped trains to run at speeds above 160 km/h (99 mph). ETCS satisfies the requirement of cab signalling for high speed trains, while also providing greatly increased safety. The ETCS signaling on the CMK was certified on 21 November 2013, allowing trains on the CMK to operate at 200 km/h (124 mph).

On 30 May 2011, PKP signed a contract to procure twenty Alstom Pendolino ETR 610 trains, designated PKP class ED250, capable of a maximum speed of 250 km/h (155 mph) for delivery in 2014. The first Alstom Pendolino was delivered on 12 August 2013. Plans exist to change the electrification of the CMK line from the present 3 kV DC to 25 kV AC, and the Pendolinos and the Siemens ES64U4 locomotives can operate on both electrical systems. Initially, the Pendolino trains run on the CMK line at 200 km/h (124 mph), but when the CMK electrification is changed to 25 kV AC, they will be able to run at 250 km/h (155 mph).

High speed tests using the new Pendolino on the CMK were conducted in November 2013. On the first day of tests, 16 November, the Pendolino reached 242 km/h (150 mph). On 24 November 2013 the final day of tests on the CMK the Pendolino reached 293 km/h (182 mph).

In early 2014 installation of 13 high-speed railroad switches (points in British terminology) of the most modern type was carried out at Szeligi on the CMK some 22 km south of Grodzisk Mazowiecki. These are moveable-frog (or 'swingnose') switches of the type used on French TGV and German high-speed rail lines, and the switches at Szeligi are the first such installation in Poland. All of the switches permit 250 km/h (155 mph) speed in the 'through' direction, with a diverging speed of 100 km/h (62 mph) on 5 switches and diverging speed of 60 km/h (37 mph) on 4 other switches. The installation at Szeligi was carried out by the Polish subsidiary VAE Polska of the Austrian supplier Voestalpine Weichensysteme GmbH.

On 14 December 2014 Pendolino services under the name 'Express Intercity Premium' began operating on the CMK, with trains running from Kraków and Katowice to Warsaw on the CMK and continuing to Gdańsk and Gdynia on PKP line 9. The Pendolinos reach 200 km/h (124 mph) on a total of 133 kilometers of the CMK, divided into two disjoint sections; the first regularly scheduled operation at 200 km/h in Poland. In addition, two daily Pendolinos run from Warsaw to Wrocław, running on the CMK part of the way to Częstochowa and continuing via Opole to Wrocław.

== See also ==
- High-speed rail in Poland
- Polish Coal Trunk-Line
- Broad Gauge Metallurgy Line
- Pendolino
