= Werówka =

- Village
- Location within Poland
- Coordinates: 51°28′N 20°26′E
- Country: Poland
- Voivodeship: Łódź
- County: Opoczno
- Gmina: Drzewica
- Population: 395

Werówka [vɛˈrufka] is a village in the administrative district of Gmina Drzewica, within Opoczno County, Łódź Voivodeship, in central Poland.
