= Żardki =

- Village
- Location within Poland
- Coordinates: 51°29′N 20°31′E
- Country: Poland
- Voivodeship: Łódź
- County: Opoczno
- Gmina: Drzewica

Żardki [ˈʐartki] is a village in the administrative district of Gmina Drzewica, within Opoczno County, Łódź Voivodeship, in central Poland.

== Climate ==
The climate is moderately continental with warm summers and moderately cold winters. The warmest month of the year is July (March) and the coldest is January (February) .
