= Brzustowiec =

- Village
- Location within Poland
- Coordinates: 51°26′24″N 20°27′29″E
- Country: Poland
- Voivodeship: Łódź
- County: Opoczno
- Gmina: Drzewica
- Population: 802

Brzustowiec [bʐusˈtɔvjɛt͡s] is a village in the administrative district of Gmina Drzewica, within Opoczno County, Łódź Voivodeship, in central Poland.
