= Dubravko =

Dubravko (Serbian: Дубравко) is a masculine given name of Slavic origin, derived from dubrava meaning "oak grove". The name can refer to:

- Dubravko Bužimski Jelačić, Croatian writer
- Dubravko Detoni, Croatian composer, pianist and writer
- Dubravko Jovanović, Serbian actor
- Dubravko Kolinger, German football defender
- Dubravko Ledić, former Bosnian football midfielder
- Dubravko Mataković (canoeist), Croatian slalom canoer
- Dubravko Mataković (illustrator), Croatian comics artist
- Dubravko Merlić, Croatian television journalist, producer and author
- Dubravko Pavličić, Croatian football player
- Dubravko Posavec, Bosnian ice hockey player
- Dubravko Šimenc, Croatian water polo player
- Dubravko Škiljan, Croatian linguist
- Dubravko Tešević, Bosnian football player

== See also ==
- Dubravka, the feminine version
