= Augustów, Opoczno County =

Augustów
- Village
- Location within Poland
- Coordinates: 51°27′N 20°28′E
- Country: Poland
- Voivodeship: Łódź
- County: Opoczno
- Gmina: Drzewica

Augustów [auˈɡustuf] is a village in the administrative district of Gmina Drzewica, within Opoczno County, Łódź Voivodeship, in central Poland.
