= Żdżary, Opoczno County =

Żdżary
- Village
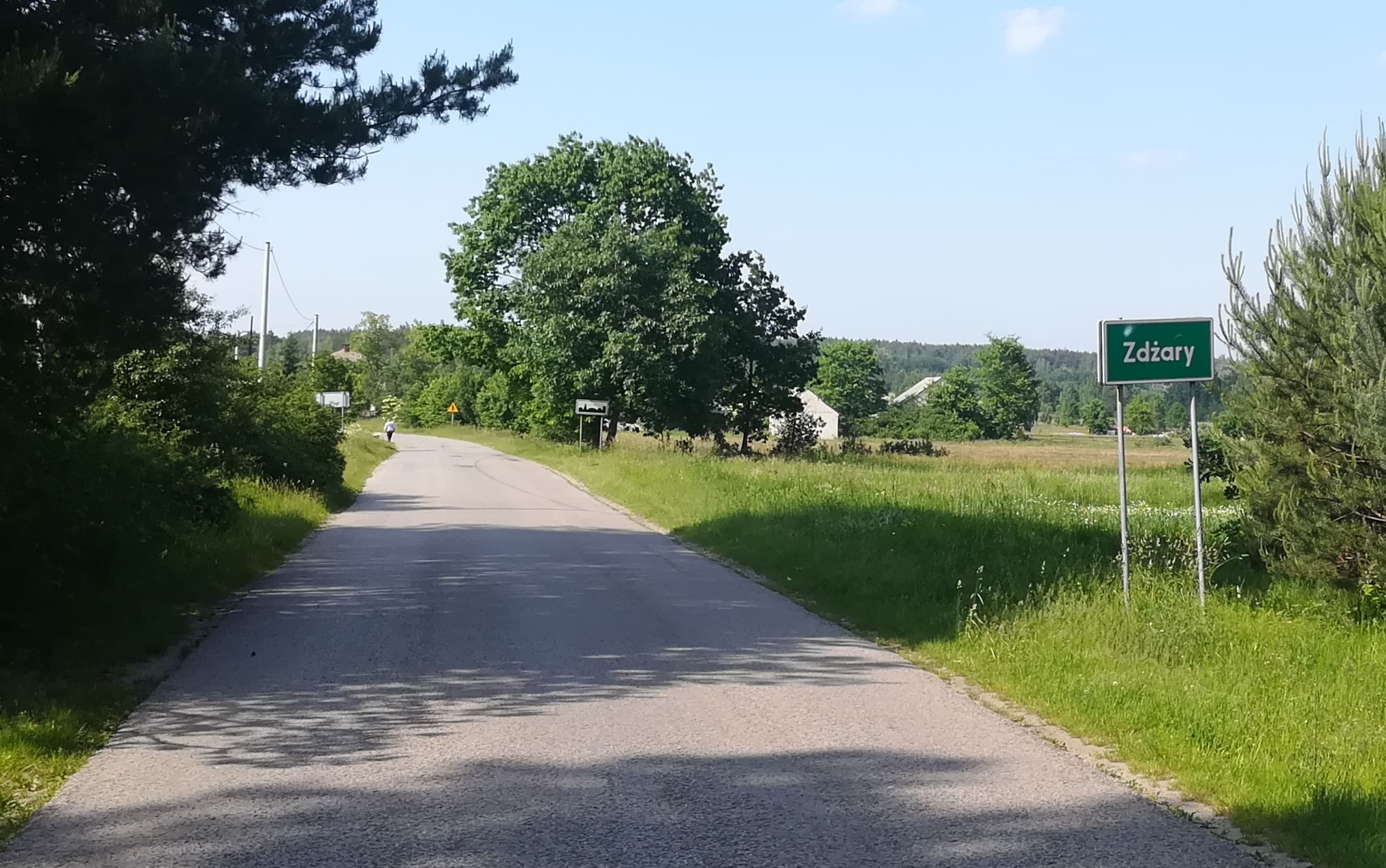

- Location within Poland
- Coordinates: 51°28′54″N 20°28′0″E
- Country: Poland
- Voivodeship: Łódź
- County: Opoczno
- Gmina: Drzewica

Żdżary [ˈʐd͡ʐarɨ] is a village in the administrative district of Gmina Drzewica, within Opoczno County, Łódź Voivodeship, in central Poland.
