= Trzebina, Łódź Voivodeship =

Trzebina
- Village
- Location within Poland
- Coordinates: 51°26′N 20°22′E
- Country: Poland
- Voivodeship: Łódź
- County: Opoczno
- Gmina: Drzewica

Trzebina [tʂɛˈbina] is a village in the administrative district of Gmina Drzewica, within Opoczno County, Łódź Voivodeship, in central Poland.
