= Zakościele, Opoczno County =

Zakościele
- Village
- Location within Poland
- Coordinates: 51°27′47″N 20°29′11″E
- Country: Poland
- Voivodeship: Łódź
- County: Opoczno
- Gmina: Drzewica

Zakościele [zakɔɕˈt͡ɕɛlɛ] is a village in the administrative district of Gmina Drzewica, within Opoczno County, Łódź Voivodeship, in central Poland.
