= Doubravka =

Doubravka is a female given name of Slavic origin. It derives from the Slavic word doubrava meaning oak grove and is pronounced dow-brahf-kah in Czech.

== Nicknames ==
- Czech: Doubra, Doubravuše, Doubruše, Duběnka, Doubí (dow-bee), Duba, Doubinka, Dubi, Dobra

== Name Days ==
- Czech: 19 January

== Other variants ==
- Доубравка: Bulgarian
- Dubravka: Bosnian, Croatian
- Dúbravka: Slovak
- Dąbrówka: Polish (pronounced: dam-bruf-kah)
- Дубравка: Serbian, Russian

== Famous bearers ==
- Doubravka Přemyslovna, Bohemian princess, member of the Přemyslid dynasty and by marriage Duchess of the Polans
- Doubravka Svobodová, Czech director of Divadlo Na zábradlí (from 1993)
- Mgr. Doubravka Olšáková, Czech historian

== Fictional Doubravka’s ==
- Psychologist Doubravka, a character from Czech film comedy Léto s kovbojem (The Summer with Cowboy)
