= Domaszno =

- Village
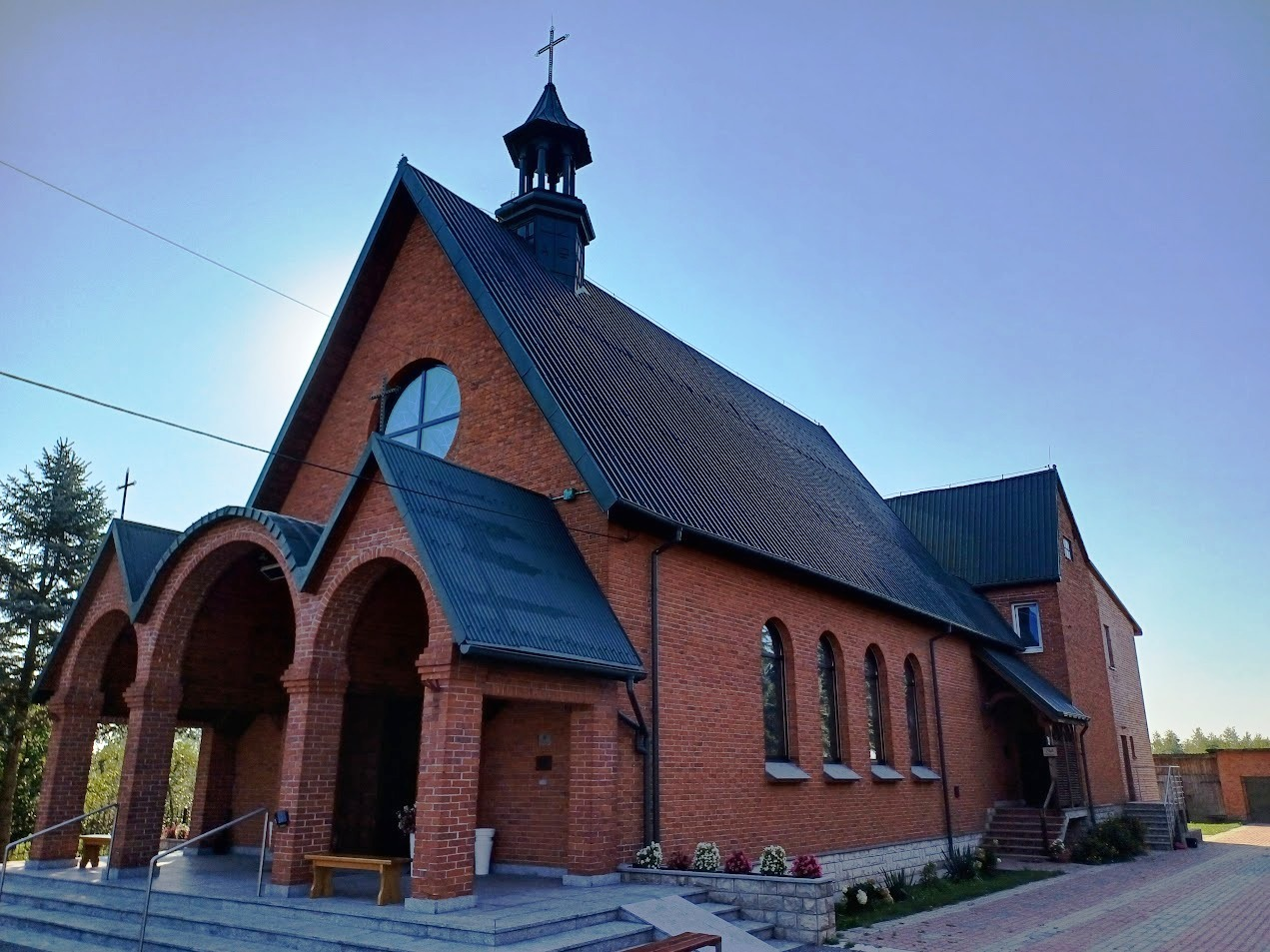
- Catholic church

- Location within Poland
- Coordinates: 51°29′23″N 20°29′20″E
- Country: Poland
- Voivodeship: Łódź
- County: Opoczno
- Gmina: Drzewica
- Population: 539

Domaszno [dɔˈmaʂnɔ] is a village in the administrative district of Gmina Drzewica, within Opoczno County, Łódź Voivodeship, in central Poland.
