= Brzuza, Łódź Voivodeship =

Brzuza
- Village
- Location within Poland
- Coordinates: 51°28′N 20°22′E
- Country: Poland
- Voivodeship: Łódź
- County: Opoczno
- Gmina: Drzewica

Brzuza [ˈbʐuza] is a village in the administrative district of Gmina Drzewica, within Opoczno County, Łódź Voivodeship, in central Poland.
