= Gmina Drzewica =

Gmina Drzewica Drzewica Commune
- Gmina

- Coat of arms
- Interactive map of Gmina Drzewica
- Coordinates (Drzewica): 51°26′49″N 20°28′19″E
- Country: Poland
- Voivodeship: Łódź
- County: Opoczno
- Seat: Drzewica

Area
  - Total: 118.42 km^{2} (45.72 sq mi)

Population (2016)
  - Total: 10,649
  - Density: 89.926/km^{2} (232.91/sq mi)
  - Urban: 3,913
  - Rural: 7,108
- Time zone: UTC+1 (CET)
  - Summer (DST): UTC+2 (CEST)
- Website: www.drzewica.pl

Gmina Drzewica is an urban-rural gmina (administrative district) in Opoczno County, Łódź Voivodeship, in central Poland. Its seat is the town of Drzewica, which lies approximately 15 kilometres (9 mi) north-east of Opoczno and 79 km (49 mi) south-east of the regional capital Łódź.

The gmina covers an area of 118.42 square kilometres (45.7 sq mi), and as of 2016 its total population is 10,649 (out of which the population of Drzewica amounts to 3,913, and the population of the rural part of the gmina is 10,649).

== Villages ==
Apart from the town of Drzewica, Gmina Drzewica contains the villages and settlements of:

- Augustów
- Brzustowiec
- Brzuza
- Dąbrówka
- Domaszno
- Giełzów
- Idzikowice
- Jelnia
- Krzczonów
- Radzice Duże
- Radzice Małe
- Strzyżów
- Świerczyna
- Trzebina
- Werówka
- Zakościele
- Żardki
- Żdżary

== Neighbouring gminas ==
Gmina Drzewica is bordered by the gminas of Gielniów, Odrzywół, Opoczno, Poświętne and Rusinów.
