= Świerczyna, Opoczno County =

Świerczyna
- Village
- Location within Poland
- Coordinates: 51°26′6″N 20°22′53″E
- Country: Poland
- Voivodeship: Łódź
- County: Opoczno
- Gmina: Drzewica

Świerczyna (Polish pronunciation: [ɕfjɛrˈt͡ʂɨna]) is a village in the administrative district of Gmina Drzewica, within Opoczno County, Łódź Voivodeship, in central Poland.
