= PKP class ED250 =

High-speed electric multiple unit from the Pendolino family

ED250
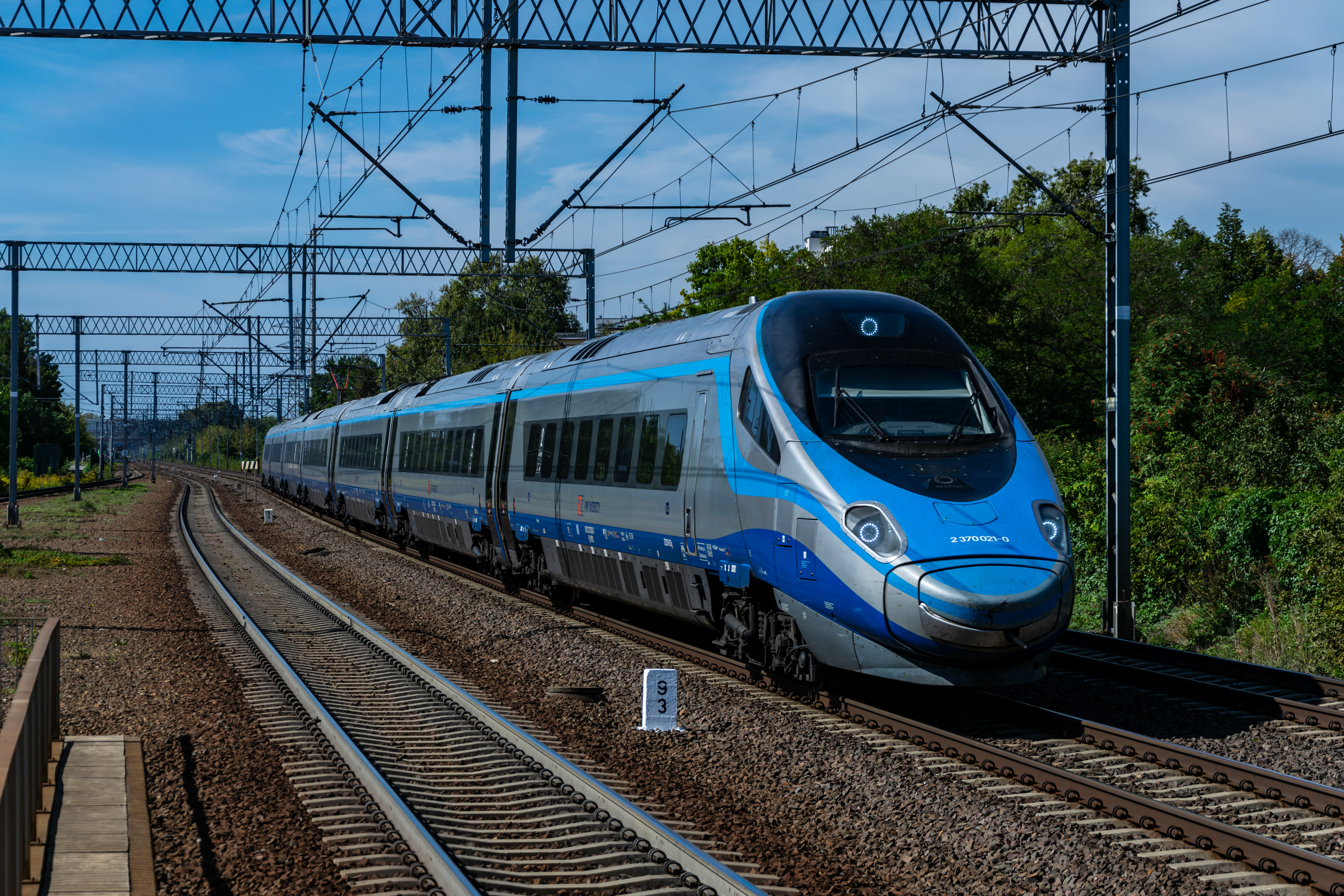
- ED250-003 in 2024
- Stock type: Electric multiple unit
- Manufacturer: Alstom
- Assembly: Savigliano, Italy
- Family name: New Pendolino
- Constructed: 2011–2014
- Number built: 20
- Formation: 7 cars per trainset
- Capacity: 402

Specifications
- Train length: 187.4 m (615 ft)
- Width: 2,830 mm (111 in)
- Height: 4,100 mm (160 in)
- Floor height: 1,260 mm (50 in)
- Maximum speed: 250 km/h (160 mph) (Design speed); 200 km/h (120 mph) (Operational speed); 293 km/h (182 mph) (Record speed)
- Weight: 410 t (900,000 lb)
- Engine type: induction motor
- Power output: 5,664 kW (7,596 hp)
- Acceleration: 0.49 m/s²
- Electric systems: Overhead line; 3,000 V DC; 15 kV 16.7 Hz AC; 25 kV 50 Hz AC
- UIC classification: (1A)(A1)+(1A)(A1)+2’2’+2’2’+ 2’2’+(1A)(A1)+(1A)(A1)
- Safety systems: SHP, Sifa, PZB, LZB, ETCS, MIREL

Alstom EMU250 (series ED250) is a seven-car standard gauge high-speed electric multiple unit from the Pendolino family, manufactured by Alstom at the factory in Savigliano, Italy, as the Alstom ETR 610 model, commissioned by PKP Intercity. A total of 20 units were produced, and since 14 December 2014, they have been operating Express InterCity Premium trains on routes connecting Warsaw with Bielsko-Biała, Gdynia, Gliwice, Jelenia Góra, Katowice, Kołobrzeg, Kraków, Rzeszów, Wrocław and Szczecin.

== History ==
=== ETR460 tests in Poland ===
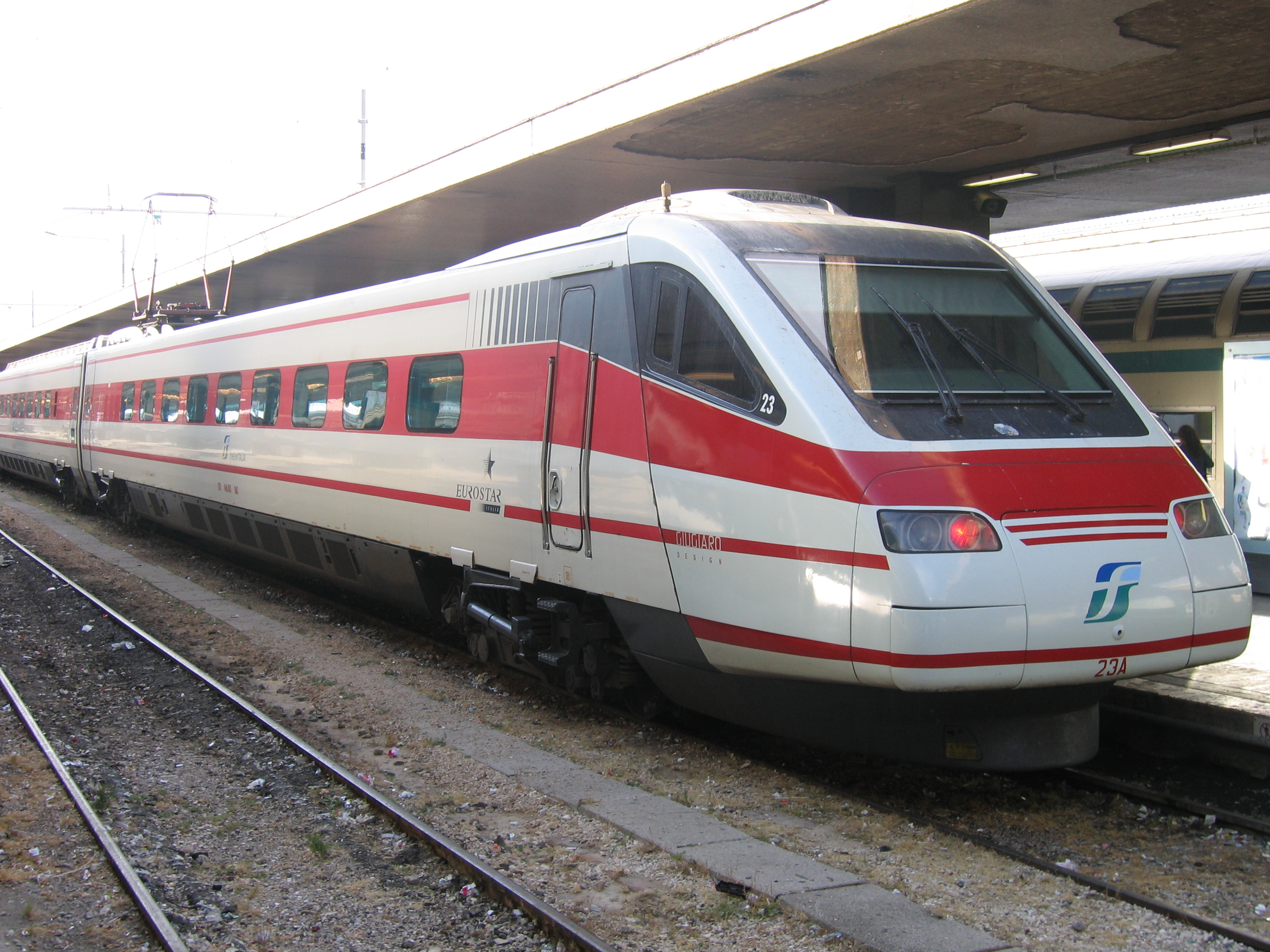
ETR460

On 6 May 1994, a Pendolino ETR 460 train with tilting technology arrived in Poland for high-speed rail testing. The train consisted of three cars: a motorized head car (460 260), a motorized passenger car (460 007), and a trailer car (460 000).

On 9 May 1994, the train traveled under its own power from Katowice to Idzikowice for maximum speed tests on the Central Rail Line. A two-car formation was used for the tests, consisting of motor cars, one equipped with a current collector and driver's cab, and the other without a current collector but featuring a braking station at the rear. The train was powered by four traction motors with a total power of 2,000 kW. The test runs were conducted on a closed track (track 2) between Strzałki, Biała Rawska, and Szeligi. Tests began on the same day with a scheduled speed of 160 km/h. On May 10, seven runs were conducted, achieving maximum speeds of 183, 204, 227, 224, 236, 236, and 244 km/h. After analyzing data from the measuring equipment, current collector performance, and interaction with the overhead line, it was decided to attempt a higher speed. On May 11, the train reached speeds of 200 and 245 km/h on the test section. It was determined that the results justified an attempt to reach the ETR 460’s maximum speed of 250 km/h. The test commenced at 1:14 PM, and after 5 minutes and 47 seconds, around the 40th kilometer of the Central Rail Line near the Biała Rawska station, the train reached 250.1 km/h, setting a speed record for Central and Eastern Europe.

On 16 May 1994, a second series of tests began on the line from Warsaw to Gdańsk to evaluate the benefits of the tilting technology. In two test runs on the selected section, maximum speeds and lateral acceleration were recorded at 113 km/h with 0.6 m/s², and 122 km/h with 0.8 m/s². The following day, six more runs were conducted, and on May 18, in rainy conditions, two additional runs took place, yielding different results due to the changed weather conditions.

During the ETR 460's stay in Poland, lasting until 23 May 1994, in addition to test runs, promotional runs were conducted for invited guests on the route from Warsaw to Gdańsk, and the train was showcased at stations in Katowice, Częstochowa, Gdańsk, and Warsaw.

The positive results from all tests conducted in May 1994 demonstrated that it was possible in Poland to increase line speeds and improve rail travel comfort. In the mid-1990s, Polish State Railways began upgrading the partially overlapping E65 line on the route between Gdynia, Warsaw and Katowice. The main goal of this investment was to increase the allowable speeds and adapt the tracks for high-speed trains.

=== First tender ===
Following a financial analysis conducted in 1996, Polish State Railways management decided to launch a tender on 8 August 1997 for the supply of 16 tilting body trains. The two-stage tender process concluded on 20 July 1998 with Fiat Ferroviaria winning with its offer of the Pendolino ETR 460. The other two bidders, Siemens Mobility and Adtranz, filed appeals, but these were rejected on 21 August 1998 by the arbitration team of the Public Procurement Office.

=== Cancellation of the first tender ===
In 1998, the Supreme Audit Office began an inspection of the tender process, which concluded in February 1999. The report identified several shortcomings related to the preparation and conduct of the tender. The main reason for this assessment was the auditors' finding that Polish State Railways lacked the infrastructure necessary to utilize the capabilities of the ordered trains and was not financially prepared for the investment. It was also found that the decision to conduct the tender was based on financial results from 1996, and when the Polish State Railways management made the resolution to approve the selected train supplier, they did not support it with an up-to-date feasibility analysis. The Supreme Audit Office issued a recommendation to cease negotiations with Fiat and annul the tender. On 7 December 1999, the Polish State Railways management annulled the tender in line with the Supreme Audit Office's recommendations.

=== Second tender ===
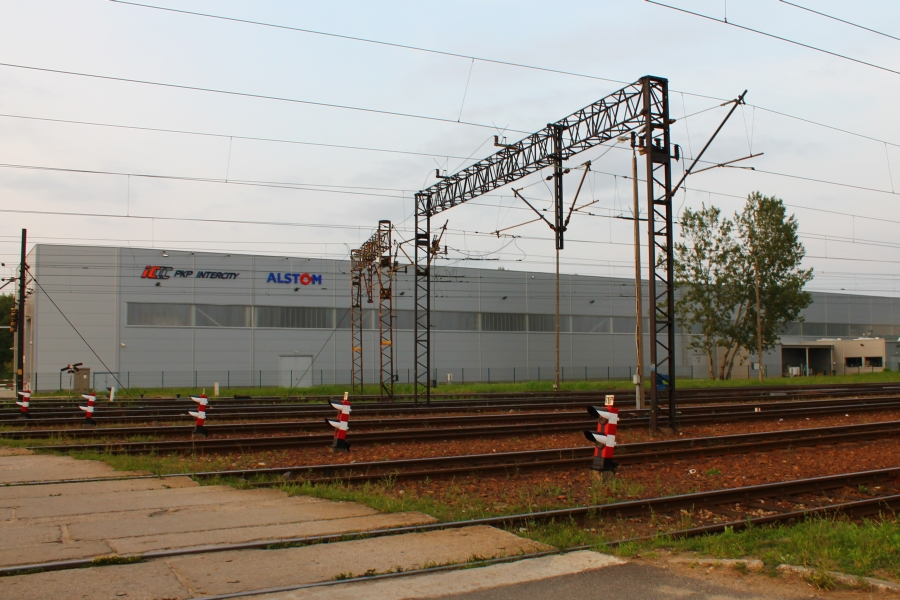
Maintenance hall at the Warszawa Grochów railway station

In early August 2008, PKP Intercity announced a tender for the supply of 20 high-speed trainsets with a maximum speed of 250 km/h. Contrary to the initial plans, the required maximum speed was raised from 200 km/h to 250 km/h, and the requirement for a tilting body system was dropped. Six companies expressed interest in the tender: Alstom, AnsaldoBreda with Newag, Construcciones y Auxiliar de Ferrocarriles, Siemens Mobility, Bombardier Transportation with Pesa, and Talgo. In September 2010, the bids were opened, and Alstom was the sole bidder.

On 30 May 2011, PKP Intercity signed a contract with Alstom Transport worth 665 million euros for the delivery of 20 seven-car New Pendolino trains without a tilting mechanism, and the construction of a technical facility in Warsaw dedicated exclusively to maintaining high-speed rail rolling stock. The contract also includes technical maintenance of the trains for a period of up to 17 years. PKP Intercity received government guarantees for financing the purchase in accordance with the strategy adopted by the European Commission for the development of high-speed rail, and secured a loan from the European Investment Bank for 224 million euros (later increased to 342 million euros).

In October 2012, the French company Karmar began construction of the technical facility for Pendolino trains at the Warsaw Grochów service station in the Olszynka Grochowska area of the Praga-Południe district. The investment included the construction of a hall comprising four service tracks, a wash facility, and office and social spaces. The construction of the base was completed in April 2014, at which time the delivered Pendolino trains were moved into the facility.

=== Promotional presentations and testing ===
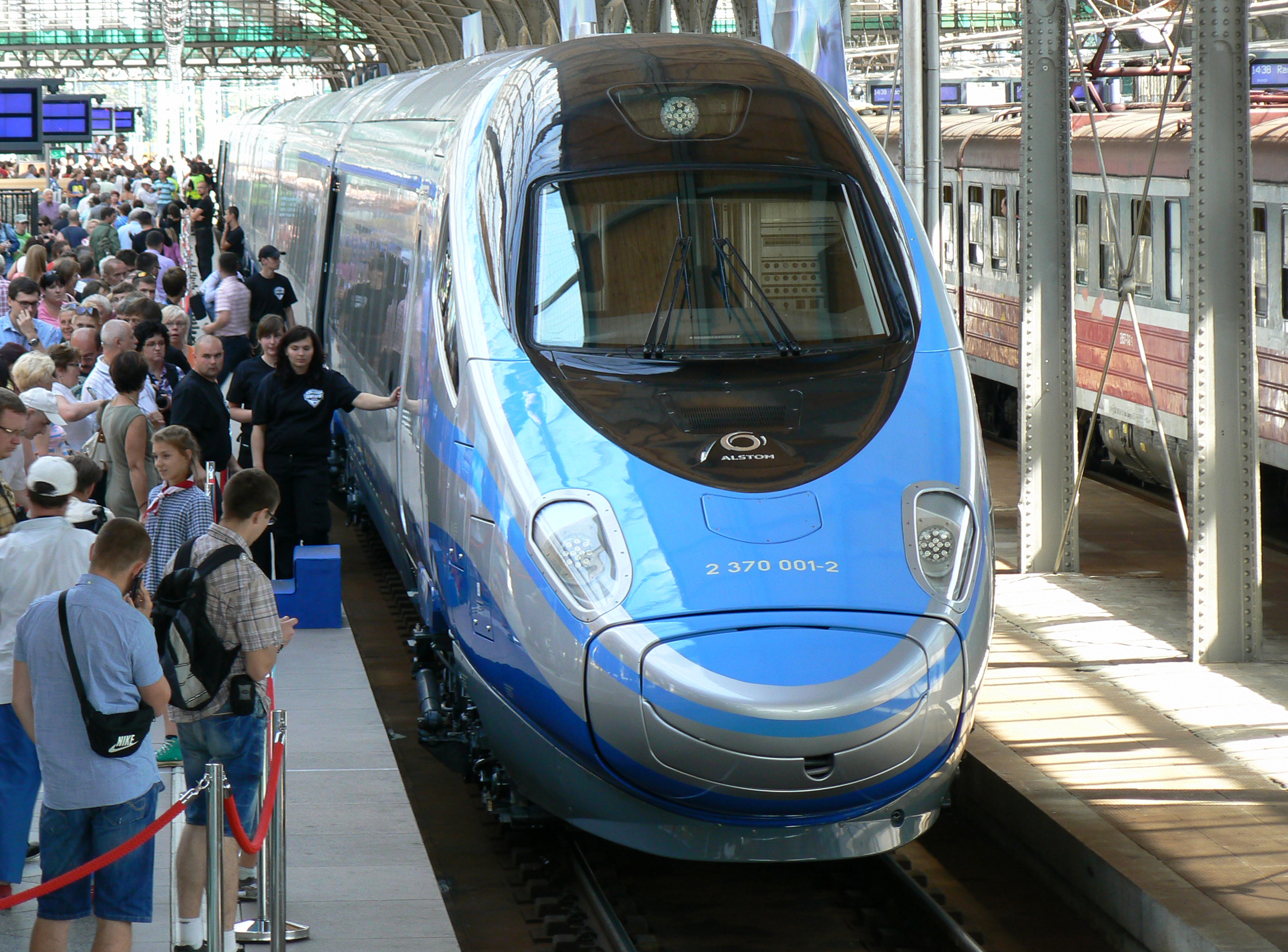
Presentation at Wrocław Główny railway station

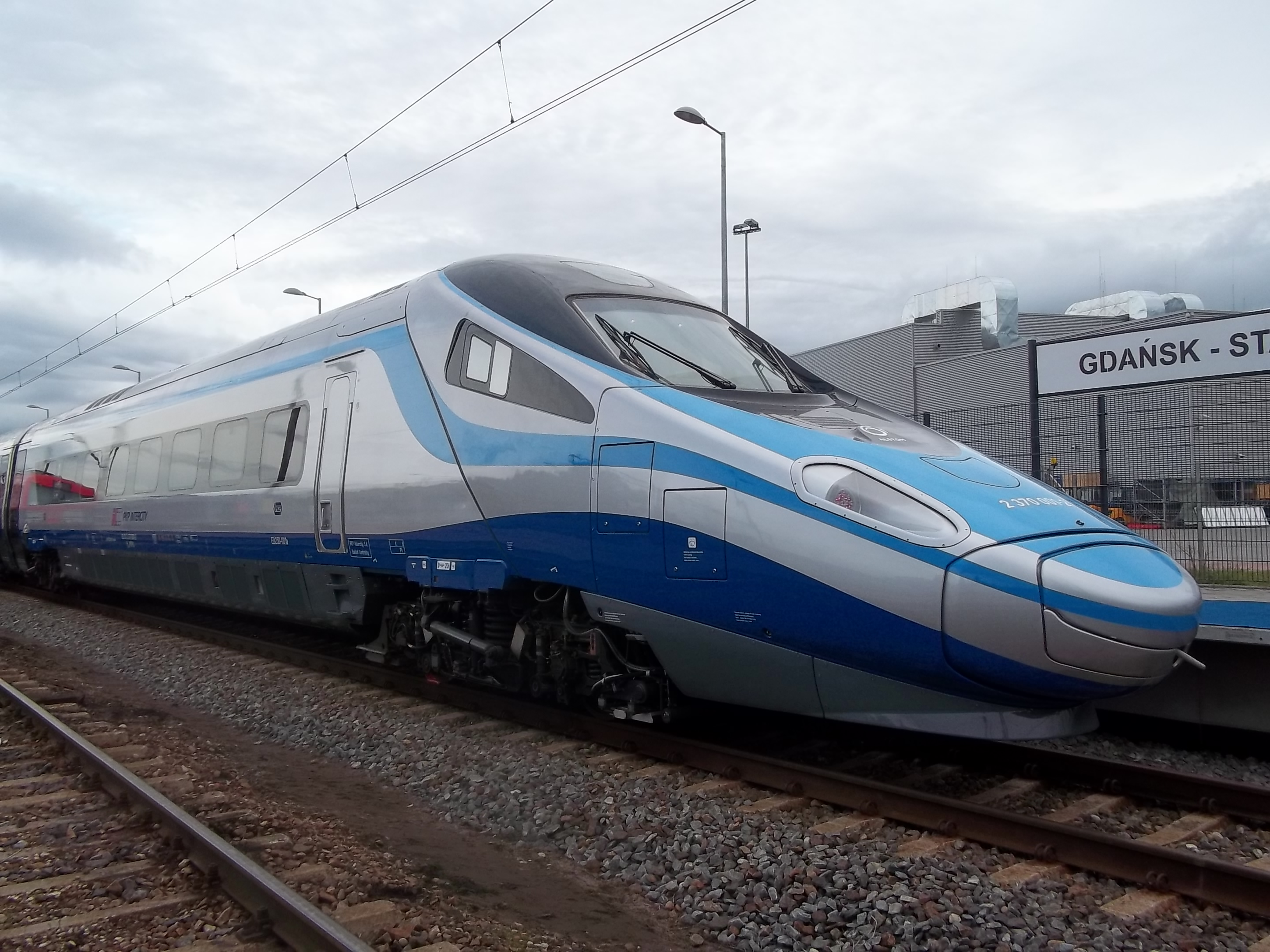
Presentation at Trako fair

On 17 June 2013, the first trainset for PKP Intercity was unveiled in Italy, and on August 12, after arriving in Poland, it was presented at Wrocław Główny railway station. The train was then transported to the experimental track of the Test Track Centre near Żmigród, where testing began on August 19. On September 1, the vehicle was moved to Warsaw for an undercarriage inspection at the facility in Olszynka Grochowska. At the end of September, Pendolino was showcased at the Trako fair in Gdańsk. The second trainset, ED250-002, arrived in Poland on October 24. By the end of October, testing on the Żmigród test track was completed. On October 30, tests on railway lines commenced, with the first route being the line from Warsaw Grochów to Konin, where the train reached a speed of 160 km/h. In the following days, Pendolino was tested near Grybów to evaluate its performance on steep gradients and descents, and on the line from Nidzica to Olsztyn to assess its behavior on tight curves. On 16 November 2013, Pendolino testing on the Central Rail Line began, and on the first day, the train reached a speed of 242 km/h.

On 17 November 2013, at the 184th kilometer of the Central Rail Line (near the Pilica bridge), the ED250 set a new speed record on Polish railway tracks, reaching 270 km/h, which was broken the following weekend. On 23 November 2013, the Pendolino train reached 291 km/h, and the next day it achieved 293 km/h. This is the highest speed ever reached in the history of Pendolino train operations worldwide.

During the final weekend of testing in Poland, between 7 and 8 December 2013, the operation of safety systems – ETCS and Radio-Stop – was tested. On 25 April 2014, one of the trainsets was transported to the experimental track near Velim in the Czech Republic for further odometric ETCS testing. In July, odometric ETCS tests were conducted on the Central Rail Line, and on September 6, brake performance and its impact on railway traffic control devices were tested on several lines in western Poland.

=== Deliveries ===
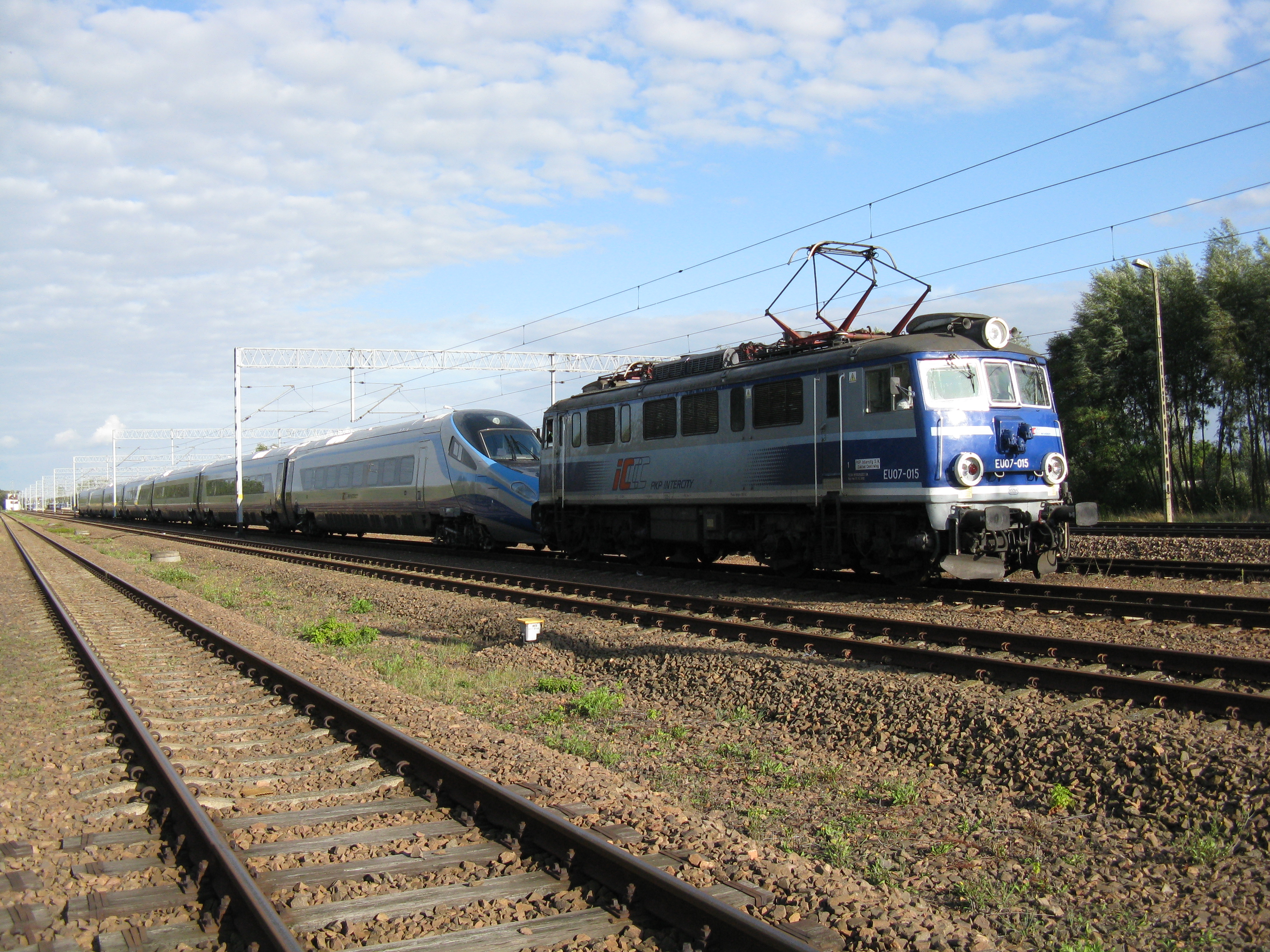
One of the trainsets during transport

The vehicles were delivered to Poland from the Italian-Austrian border by PKP Cargo as a special shipment. By the end of 2013, four trains had arrived in the country. The deadline for the delivery of the first eight Pendolino trains was 6 May 2014, but the trains were not handed over due to issues with obtaining certification. Ultimately, on September 11, the first trainsets received type approval from the Office of Rail Transport. By September, 14 trainsets were physically in Poland, and by mid-October, the first two trainsets were accepted by PKP Intercity. By mid-November, 17 trainsets were in Poland, of which 11 had been accepted. By the start of passenger services on 14 December 2014, 15 trainsets had been accepted. The final trainset, number 001, which set a new speed record, was delivered to Poland on 14 February 2015, and after testing, it had to return to Italy. By the end of March, 18 trainsets had been accepted, and the delivery of all 20 vehicles was completed by the end of the first half of 2015.

As of 18 March 2015, the penalties for delayed trainset deliveries amounted to 48 million euros. The validity of these penalties was the subject of arbitration between PKP Intercity and the manufacturer, in which, in December 2016, the court ruled that PKP Intercity was entitled to 42.3 million euros for delivery delays. Ultimately, in early November 2017, the carrier received 185 million PLN plus interest.

=== Supreme Audit Office review ===
In November 2015, the Supreme Audit Office released a report on the operations of the PKP Group from 2010 to 2013. In this report, the office stated that:

The actions of railway companies related to the acquisition of Pendolino trains for passenger transport at speeds of 220–250 km/h were uncoordinated, leading to an economically unjustified purchase.

NIK auditors found the purchase economically unjustified due to delays in the modernization of railway lines by PKP Polskie Linie Kolejowe and PKP Energetyka, which prevented the full utilization of the trains' maximum speeds. In the auditors' opinion, it would have been more appropriate to purchase trains with a maximum speed of 200 km/h instead of 250 km/h. The auditors also criticized the need for additional stops in smaller towns due to EU funding requirements.

=== Additional tests ===
Under the contract for the delivery of Pendolino units, the manufacturer was obliged to obtain approval for the units to operate on Austrian, Czech, and German rail networks within 5 years from the delivery of the last vehicle. At the beginning of 2017, the operator sent one unit to Germany for necessary tests on the route from Nuremberg to Ingolstadt. The unit returned to Poland on June 3.

On 18/19 March 2017, tests were conducted on the route to Zakopane in preparation for a future connection between Warsaw and Zakopane.

On 15 May 2018, two test runs of the ED250-001 unit were carried out in the Czech Republic between the Bohumin and Polom stations.

On 30 January 2019, PKP Intercity leased the ED250-001 unit to the manufacturer for further testing.

On 25 September 2019, the president of PKP Intercity announced that the units had received approval for operation in the Czech Republic.

Between 2020 and 2021, homologation runs were conducted in Germany, concluding with the issuance of the relevant approval on 15 December 2022. On 8 April 2020, during measurement runs near Munich, the ED250-001 suffered a brake hose rupture, causing the unit to collide with a locomotive ahead of it.

In March 2024, it was reported that the units had obtained complete foreign homologations for the railway networks in Germany, the Czech Republic, and Austria.

=== Maintenance inspections ===
The service cycle for ED250 vehicles includes 4-level inspections every 1.2 million kilometers. The first unit to reach this mileage was ED250-006 in July 2017. The inspections were carried out at the Alstom facility in Piaseczno (unlike lower-level inspections) and included wheel replacement, bogie revision, traction motor revision, and maintenance and service work on other train components. Each inspection took about a month. In January 2017, it was announced that the units would be equipped with Wi-Fi during the inspections; however, this did not happen. The inspections were completed in November 2018, with 18 out of 20 units inspected (two units were awaiting accident repairs).

=== Undercarriage damage from crushed stone ===
On 19 January 2018, six units were withdrawn from service due to detected undercarriage damage caused by crushed stone. A special commission, consisting of PKP Intercity (the operator) and PKP Polskie Linie Kolejowe (the infrastructure manager), was appointed to investigate the issue. On January 25, the Ministry of Infrastructure decided that the State Commission for Railway Accident Investigation would also join the commission. By February 1, 3 of the 6 damaged units were back in service, and by February 13, all were operational again.

On October 23, the commission concluded its work and determined that:

The incidents occurred due to weather conditions conducive to snow and ice accumulation.

On 11 January 2019, due to the risk of recurring damage caused by ballast, the train speed was temporarily limited to 160 km/h.

=== Wi-Fi installation ===
The units were not factory-equipped with Wi-Fi or mobile signal boosters, which are particularly important in such trains due to their construction negatively affecting signal strength. Equipping the trains with Wi-Fi was the subject of several years of negotiations between Alstom and PKP Intercity (the operator could not carry this out independently without voiding the warranty).

At the end of 2017, Internet tests were conducted on the route from Warsaw to Kraków, as a prelude to installing on-board Wi-Fi. Finally, on 28 August 2018, the operator signed an agreement with Alstom for Wi-Fi installation along with 5-year maintenance. By late December, installation was completed on unit number 018, and a test run with journalists was conducted on December 28. By November 2019, Wi-Fi was available on all vehicles except the unit in Italy, which had been involved in an accident in Ozimek.

== Design and structure ==
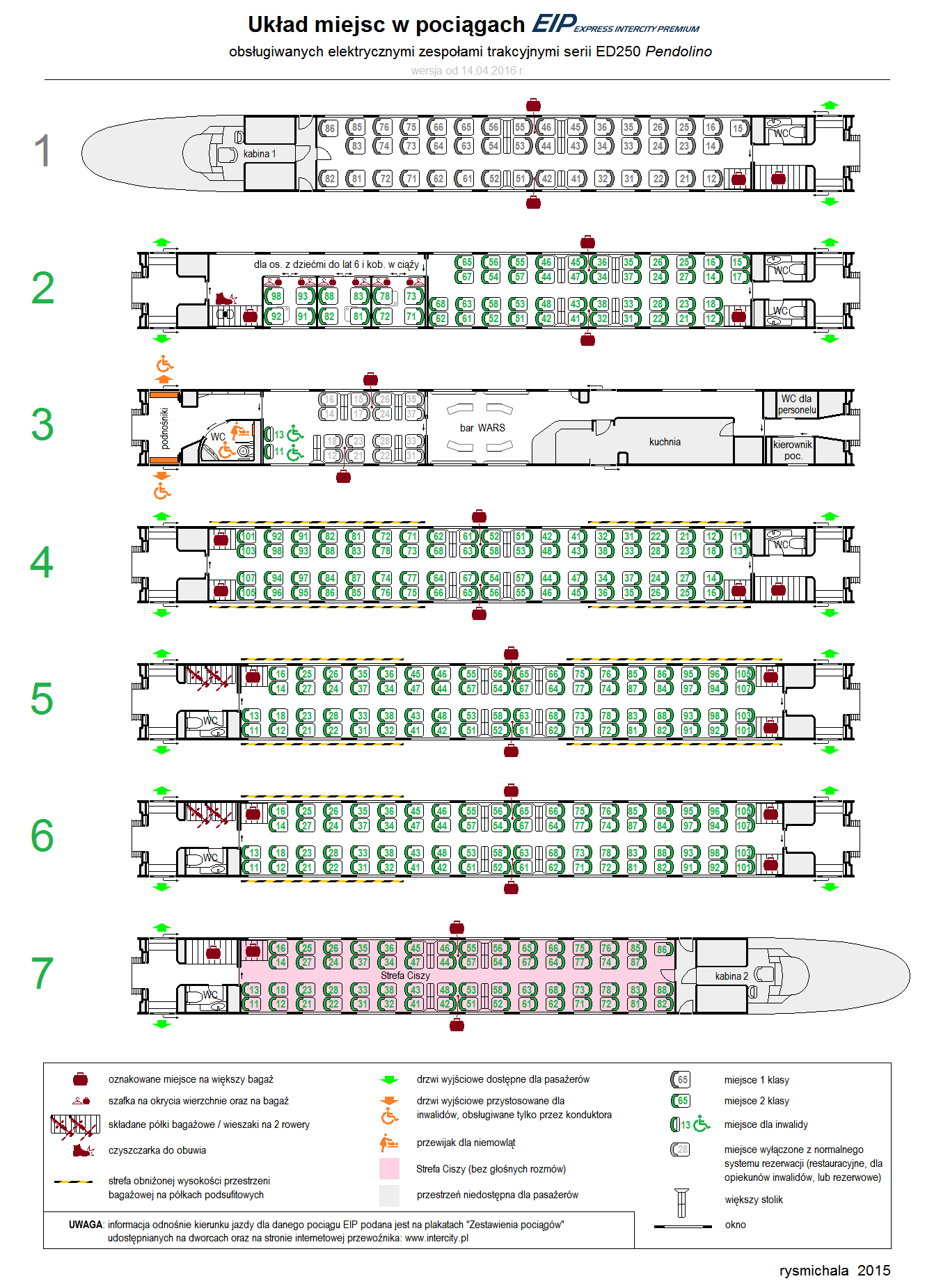
Seating arrangement in the train

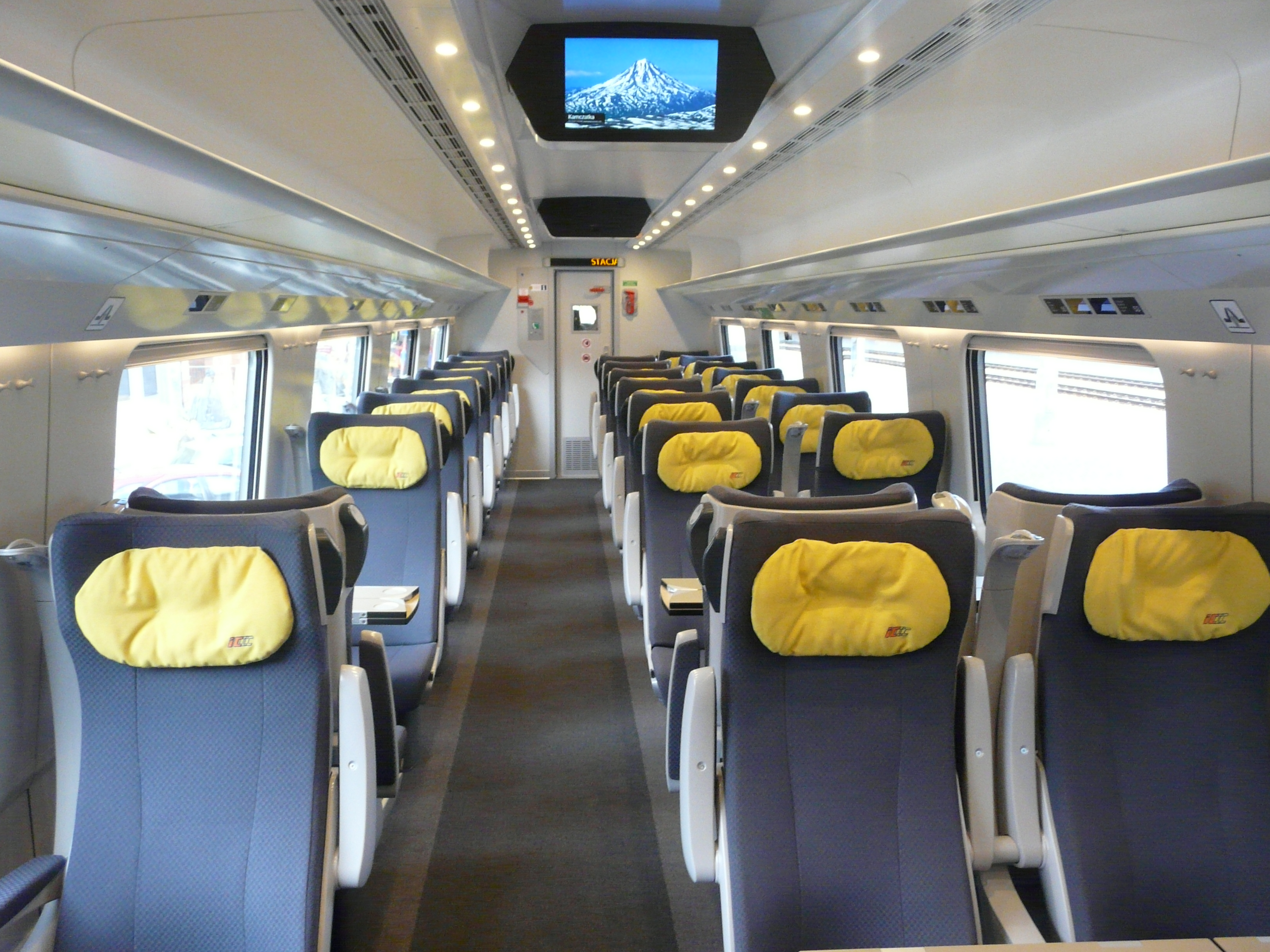
First class interior

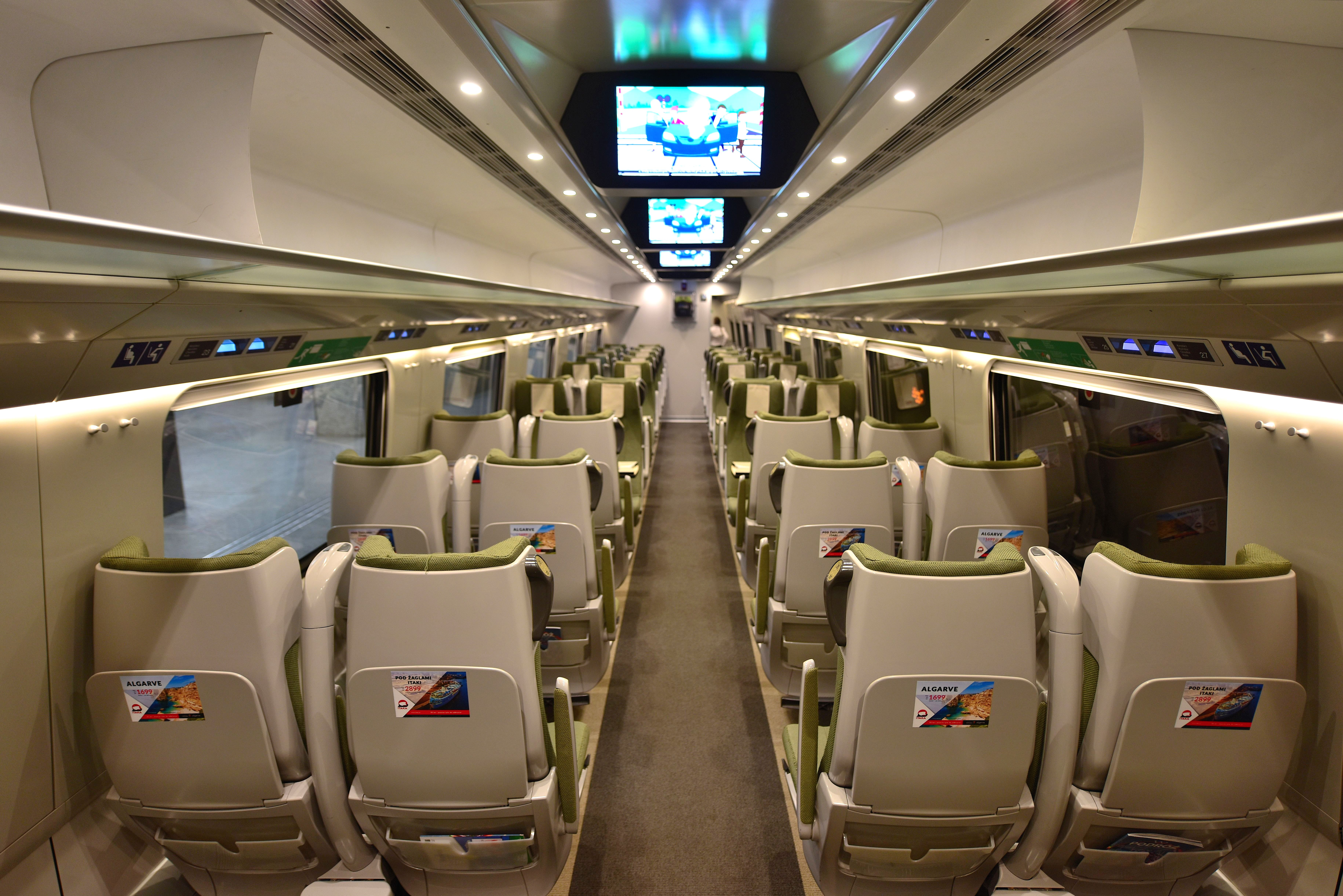
Second class interior

The Pendolino trains for PKP Intercity are based on the New Pendolino platform. The first train from this platform was the ETR610 purchased by Cisalpino, which was introduced in 2008. In the nomenclature of the Office of Rail Transport, the vehicle received the designation EMU250PKP.

=== Car body ===
The train cars have self-supporting bodies made from lightweight aluminum alloy profiles. These profiles are joined using "dovetail" connections, and the joints are welded by robotic welders. The floor, side, front, and roof panels are first produced as separate elements. Holes for windows and doors are then cut using a milling machine, and all elements are finally assembled and welded using robots.

=== Passenger space ===
Interior layout of individual cars of the ED250 Pendolino series

Car	Number of seats				Toilet			Standing luggage racks		Other features
Car	2nd class	1st class	For people in wheelchairs	Dining car	standard	for the disabled	personnel	small	large	Other features
1		45			1			1	1	
2	56				2			1	1	defibrillator
3	2		2	14		1	1			bar space, conductor's compartment
4	74				1			3	1	
5	74				1			3	1	bicycle transport
6	74				1			3	1	bicycle transport
7	61				1			1	1	quiet area
Total:	341	45	2	14	7	1	1	12	6	

=== Propulsion system ===
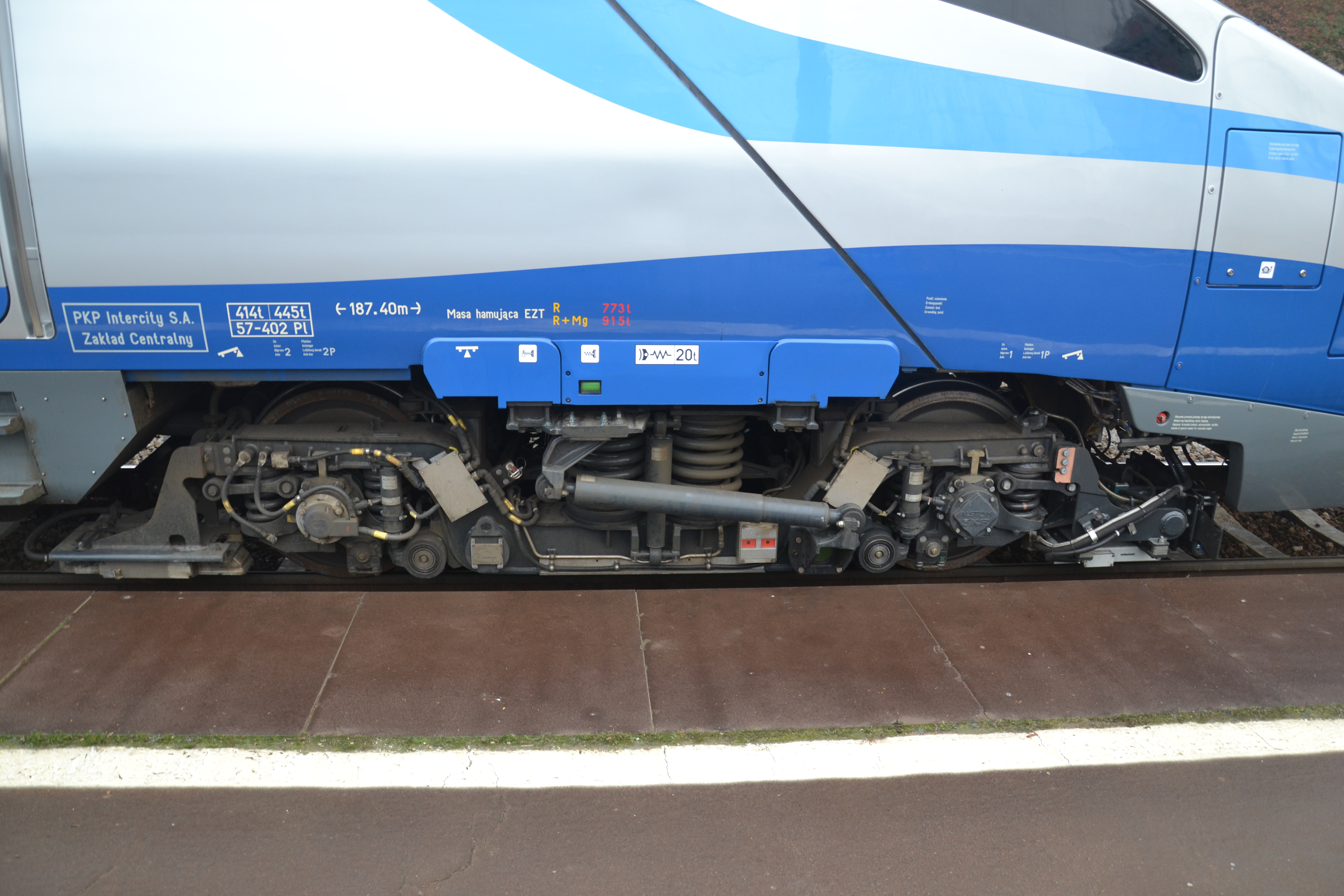
Powered bogie

The ED250 trains feature four powered cars, which are cars numbered 1, 2, 6, and 7. Each powered car has two powered bogies, with each bogie featuring one powered axle located on the inner side of the car. AC-compatible current collectors are located on the roofs of cars 3 and 6, while DC-compatible current collectors are on the roofs of cars 4 and 5. The traction converters and auxiliary inverters are placed under the bodies of cars 1, 2, 6, and 7, and the traction transformers are located under cars 4 and 5.

=== Safety systems ===
The trains are equipped with the following safety systems:

- ETCS – European Train Control System, an international European system.
- SHP_{(pl)} – safety system, used in Poland.
- MIREL_{(cs)} – safety system used in the Czech Republic.
- LZB/PZB – safety systems used in Germany and Austria.

== Operation ==
Operation of PKP Intercity's Pendolino routes: Since 14 December 2014 Since 13 December 2015 Since 29 April 2016 Since 15 December 2024 Since 14 December 2025

On 14 December 2014, Pendolino trains began operating under the new Express InterCity Premium category, serving routes connecting Warsaw with Gdynia, Katowice, Kraków, and Wrocław. On 13 December 2015, the network was expanded to include Bielsko-Biała, Gliwice, and Rzeszów, and on 29 April 2016, Kołobrzeg and Jelenia Góra were added. On 15 December 2024, the Pendolino train network was expanded to include a connection between Warsaw and Szczecin via Poznań. Since 14 December 2025, the Pendolino also runs between Gdynia and Zakopane.

During the initial months of operation, due to delivery delays, some originally planned EIP trains were replaced by Express InterCity trains, and one was canceled. On February 15, March 15, and April 26, 2015, during timetable adjustments, additional temporary EIC trains were replaced by EIP trains. The last of the 20 ordered vehicles was put into service in June.

The maximum speed achieved by the trains is 200 km/h. At the start of service, 77 km out of 976 km of railway lines on which these trains operated were adapted to the 200 km/h speed. On 27 July 2016, during World Youth Day, the ED250 train ran in double traction with passengers for the first time.

During the first year of operation, the trains carried 3.56 million passengers and covered 6.32 million kilometers.

On 7 April 2017, at a railway crossing on the route from Chrząstowice to Ozimek, a truck collided with the ED250-002 train traveling from Wrocław to Warsaw, injuring 18 people. It wasn't until April 2019 that the train was transported to the manufacturer for repairs, estimated to cost 8.5 million euros. On 26 September 2017, the ED250-003 train struck the rear of a bus on the route from Nasielsk to Modlin, with no fatalities.

By the end of April 2019, the trains had covered a total of 30 million kilometers and carried 17.5 million passengers.

In the second half of March 2020, due to the COVID-19 pandemic, Pendolino train services were completely suspended; on May 22, the first trains resumed regular operations.
