= Giełzów, Łódź Voivodeship =

Village in Gmina Drzewica, Poland

Giełzów
- Village
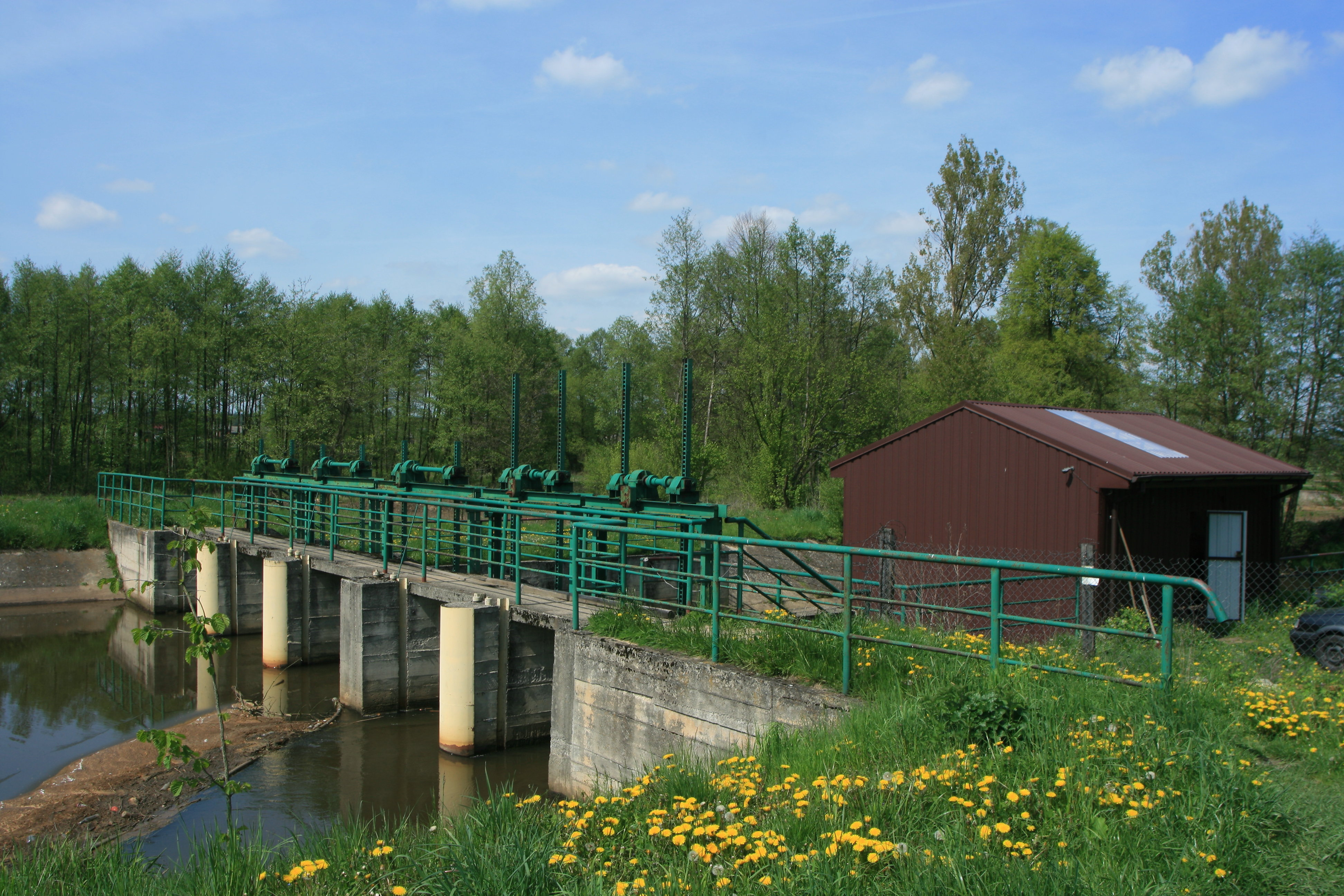

- Location within Poland
- Coordinates: 51°27′23″N 20°22′33″E
- Country: Poland
- Voivodeship: Łódź
- County: Opoczno
- Gmina: Drzewica

Giełzów [ˈɡʲɛu̯zuf] is a village in the administrative district of Gmina Drzewica, within Opoczno County, Łódź Voivodeship, in central Poland.
