= High-speed rail in Poland =

High-speed rail service (Polish: Kolej dużych prędkości) commenced in Poland on 14 December 2014, with the introduction of 20 non-tilting New Pendolino trainsets operating on four designated lines radiating out from Warsaw. Polish State Railways started passenger service using Pendolino trains operating at a maximum speed of 200 km/h on 80 km line Olszamowice-Zawiercie (part of railway line called CMK, from Warsaw to Katowice/Kraków). From December 2017 there are two 200 km/h sections, 136 km long in total and from December 2020, speed 200 km/h was introduced on 45% of the Warsaw–Gdańsk railway.

Until 14 December 2024 all high-speed services operated by PKP in Poland were branded as Express Intercity Premium (EIP). From 15 December 2024, Polish State Railways introduced also locomotive-hauled trains reaching the top speed of 200 km/h, branded as Express InterCity (EIC).

== Current connections ==
Central Rail Line (Warsaw-Kraków), green line shows max speed of 200 km/h (since 2014). Since 13th December 2020, the speed limit is also raised to 200 km/h on the Warsaw–Gdańsk railway.

Detail from the map of Europe's high-speed rail lines, showing the Polish high-speed rail network (colored) and maximum speeds.
Max operational speed 310-320 km/h
Max operational speed 270-300 km/h
Max operational speed 240-260 km/h
Max operational speed 200-230 km/h
Under construction for max operational speed ≥ 200 km/h
Max operational speed < 200 km/h

PKP Intercity was initially using only nine sets a day to operate 23 EIP services from Warsaw to Gdynia, Kraków, Katowice, and Wrocław. Today most of the 20 units operate on the core Kraków - Warsaw - Gdańsk - Gdynia route, running hourly at peak times and every 2 h off-peak. The Gliwice/Bielsko-Biała - Katowice - Warsaw - Gdańsk - Gdynia route is operated five times a day. There are two Pendolinos each way per day on the Wrocław route. Headline journey times are 2 h 58 min from Warsaw to Gdańsk, 2 h 28 min to Kraków and 2 h 34 min to Katowice. EIP services from Warsaw to Wrocław run via the CMK line, Częstochowa and Opole, taking 3 h 42 min against up to 6 h for the previous route via Poznań.

In addition to the Central Rail Line from Warsaw to Kraków and Katowice, and from Warsaw to Wrocław, the Pendolinos also operate on the 350 km (220 mi) Warsaw–Gdańsk railway. In 2011-2015 the Warsaw-Gdańsk-Gdynia route was undergoing a major upgrading costing $3 billion, partly funded by the European Investment Bank, including track replacement, realignment of curves and relocation of sections of track to allow speeds up to 200 km/h (124 mph), modernization of stations, and installation of European Train Control System Level 2, which is to be completed in June 2015. When Pendolino services started on 14 December 2014 the previous Warsaw-Gdańsk rail travel time of 4 1/2 to 6 hours was reduced to 2 hours 58 minutes by Pendolino, and will be reduced further to 2 hours 40 minutes when upgrading is completed.

Several sections of the Central Rail Line currently permit speeds of 200 km/h (with a current speed record in Poland of 293 km/h) however only 160 km/h was used in commercial service. Polish Railways planned to buy Pendolino trains in 1998 but the contract was cancelled in the following year by the Supreme Audit Office due to financial losses by Polish Railways.

== Proposals ==
Historically, there have been many proposals and plans put in place by several Polish governments and/or interest groups seeking to introduce high-speed rail to Poland. As of December 2009, Poland had 700-800 km of railways suited for rail transport reaching 160 km/h.

=== Centralny Port Komunikacyjny (CPK) ===
In 2019, detailed plans were announced for Centralny Port Komunikacyjny (CPK), a megaproject with two main components: a new international airport between Warsaw and Łódź and a new nationwide high-speed railway network. This network will consist of ten major corridors radiating from the airport towards all regions of Poland, with approximately 2000 km of new high-speed-rail lines and 3700 km of modernized railway lines. The new lines will be designed for speeds of up to 350 km/h, with operational speeds of up to 250 km/h. The aim of the project is to provide fast connections between the largest urban areas in Poland and neighboring countries, with the railway station at the new CPK Airport serving as the central transport hub. Most major Polish cities (apart from Szczecin) will have a travel time to the airport of 2.5 hours or less. Connections will be extended to cities which were not collected by railway before the CPK program, such as Jastrzębie-Zdrój and Tomaszów Lubelski.

The CPK program will include international connections to the planned high-speed rail network in the Czech Republic (Katowice - Ostrava and Wałbrzych - Hradec Králové) and to Lithuania, Latvia and Estonia via Rail Baltica (Suwałki - Kaunas). This will enable travel time reductions such as Warsaw to Prague from 510 to 270 minutes and Warsaw to Kaunas from 480 to 210 minutes. The connection between Katowice and Ostrava will benefit from joint investments from the countries of the Visegrad group with the aim to link Warsaw, Brno, Bratislava and Budapest by high-speed rail.

The CPK program is planned to be implemented by 2040. Ten railway "spokes" will radiate from the CPK airport in different directions. Each spoke will consist of newly built sections and of modernized parts of the existing infrastructure. The main railway elements of the CPK program are broken down into the following spokes:

- Spoke No. 1
  - CPK - Płock - Włocławek - Grudziądz - Tczew - Tricity - Lębork - Słupsk
  - Włocławek - Toruń - Bydgoszcz - Piła - Szczecinek - Białogard - Kołobrzeg
- Spoke No. 2
  - CPK - Warsaw - Nasielsk - Ciechanów - Działdowo - Olsztyn
- Spoke No. 3
  - CPL - Warsaw - Zielonka - Tłuszcz - Czyżew - Białystok - Kuźnica
  - Białystok - Ełk - Suwałki - Trakiszki
  - Tłuszcz - Ostrołęka - Łomża - Pisz - Orzysz - Giżycko
- Spoke No. 4
  - CPK - Warsaw - Siedlce - Łuków - Biała Podlaska - Terespol
- Spoke No. 5
  - CPK - Warsaw - Otwock - Lublin - Trawniki - Chełm
  - Trawniki - Krasnystaw -- Zamość - Tomaszów Lubelski - Bełżec (- Lviv)
- Spoke No. 6
  - CPK - Grójec - Warka - Radom - Iłża - Ostrowiec Świętokrzyski - Stalowa Wola - Łętownia - Rzeszów - Sanok
  - Rzeszów - Jasło - Krosno
- Spoke No. 7
  - CPK - Central Rail Line (Centralna Magistrala Kolejowa or CMK) - new Lesser Poland and Silesia Hub (Węzeł Małopolsko-Śląski or WMŚ) - Kraków - Podłęże - Nowy Sącz/Chabówka
  - WMŚ - Czechowicz-Dziedzice - Jastrzębie Zdrój
  - WMŚ - Katowice
  - CMK - Opoczno - Końskie -Kielce - Busko Zdrój - Tarnów - Nowy Sącz - Muszyna
- Spoke No. 8
  - CPK - Skierniewice - Częstochowa - Opole - Nysa - Kłodzko
- Spoke No. 9
  - CPK - Łódź - Sieradz - Wieruszów - Wrocław - Świdnica - Wałbrzych - Lubawka
  - Sieradz - Kalisz - Poznań - Szczecin - Szczecin Goleniów
  - Kalisz - Ostrów Wielkopolski - Leszno - Głogów - Zielona Góra
  - Poznań - Zbąszynek - Gorzów Wielkopolski
- Spoke No. 10
  - CPK - Warsaw - Sochaczew - Kutno - Konin - Swarzędz - Poznań

=== Warsaw to Poznań and Wrocław via Łódź ("Y" Line) ===
Proposed "Y" Line Warsaw–Łódź–Wrocław/Poznań

Before the CPK program, plans had been made for a "Y" line that would have connected Warsaw-Łódź-Kalisz. The line would then have split into two branches to Wrocław and Poznań. The geometric layout of the line was planned to permit speeds of 360 km/h. Construction had been planned to begin around 2014 and finish in 2019. In April 2010, the tender for a feasibility study was awarded to a consortium led by Spanish company Ingenieria IDOM. The feasibility study was granted €80 million in subsidy from the European Union. The total cost of the line including construction and train sets was estimated at €6.9 billion and was planned to be partially financed by EU subsidies.

In the center of the city of Łódź the "Y" line would have traveled through a tunnel which would have linked two existing railway stations. One of them: Łódź Fabryczna would have been reconstructed as an underground station (construction contract was signed on 18 August 2011). However, the "Y" line project was cancelled in 2011 due to insufficient funding. However, the central hub of "Y" line (the Łódź Fabryczna underground station) was completed.

As part of the CPK program, new railway lines similar to those proposed in the "Y" line project were announced. The new line will link Warsaw and Łódź via the new CPK Airport. The travel time between Warsaw and Łódź will be reduced from 100 to 45 minutes (with travel times to the airport of 15 and 30 minutes, respectively). Preparatory construction works are scheduled to start at the end of 2023, while the main construction works should start in 2024. In Łódź, trains will stop at Łódź Fabryczna station and continue on to Łódź Kaliska station via a newly constructed tunnel, similarly to previously cancelled plans. Further connections from Łódź via two branches starting in Sieradz to Wrocław and Poznań will reduce travel times from Łódź to Wrocław down from 180 to 60 minutes and from Łódź to Poznań down from 200 to 65 minutes.

=== Warsaw to Kyiv and Lviv ===
In early February 2022, upon returning from a visit to Poland, Infrastructure Minister Oleksandr Kubrakov, his deputy Mustafa Nayyem and Ukrzaliznytsia CEO Oleksandr Kamyshin announced that Poland and Ukraine had agreed that a high-speed rail link would be built between Warsaw and Kyiv through Yahodyn railway station, reducing travel times by four hours. Ukrzaliznytsia also decided to remove all restrictions on rail transit to Poland beginning on 10 February 2022. After the 2022 Russian invasion of Ukraine caused a lot of damage to Ukrainian railway and airport infrastructure, the Polish government in October 2022 offered to Ukraine help post-war reconstruction, as well as adding an extra high-speed rail link between Lublin and Lviv through Zamość and Bełżec (Spoke No. 5).

== Upgraded lines ==
The Central Rail Line (CMK) Warsaw - Kraków/Katowice was originally built in 1977 to geometry appropriate for speeds up to 250 km/h, and only requires suitable signalling equipment to be fitted and some amount of modernisation works. ETCS Level 1 allowed trains to reach 200 km/h in 2014 on part of the line and a further upgrade for 250 km/h is planned.

Reconstruction work has started on the Warsaw-Gdynia (Sopot and Gdańsk) line to allow speeds up to 200 km/h for tilting trains. This initially allows trains to run to ETCS Level 1 standards with a commitment but no timetable for further upgrades to ETCS Level 2 standards. In the day of 13 December 2020 the speed limit was raised to 200 km/h on the line from Warsaw to seaport Gdynia by New Pendolino train.

== Rolling stock ==
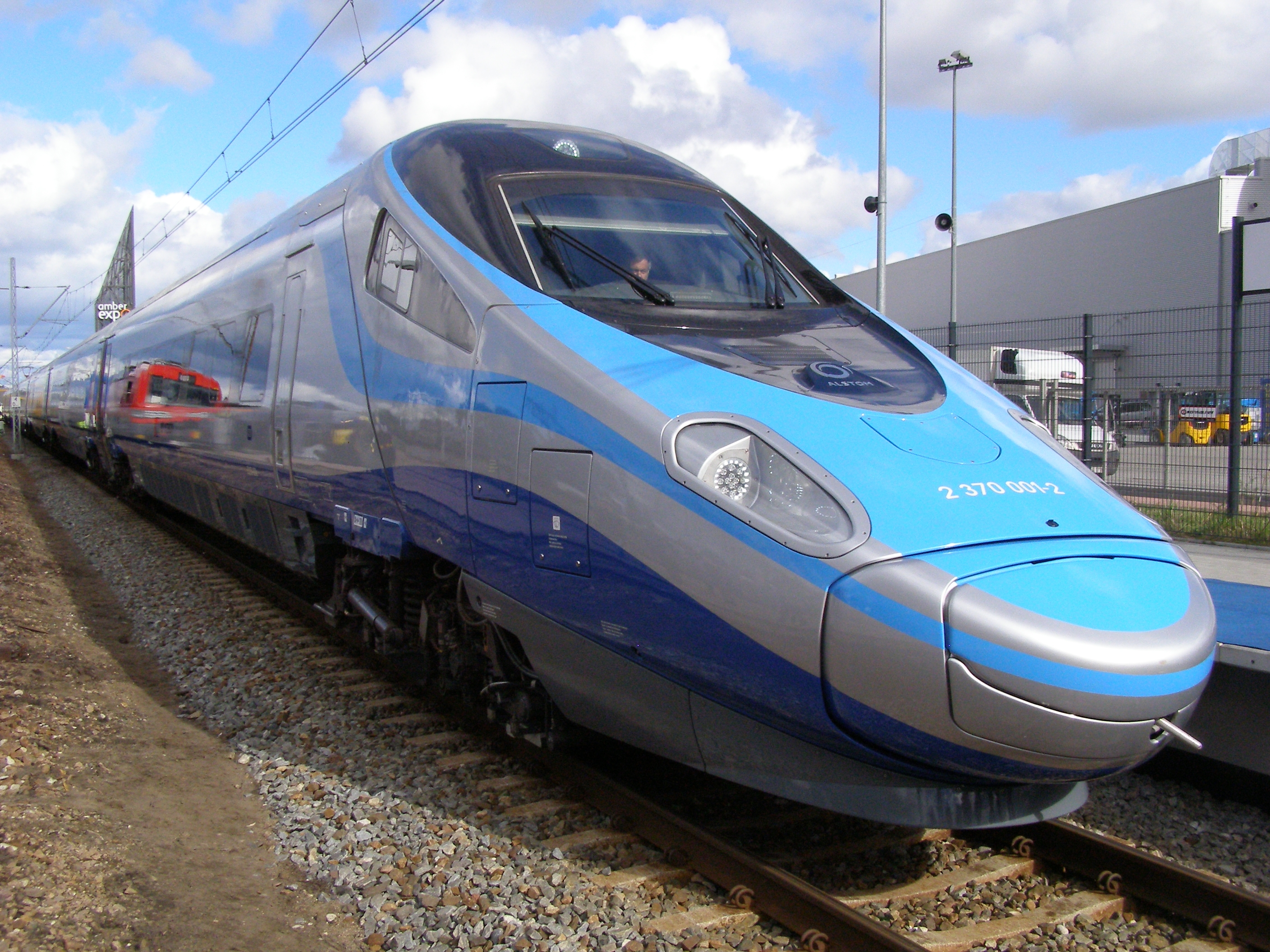
A PKP Intercity ED250 Pendolino

The seven-car Class ED250 trainsets have been supplied by Alstom Transport. Each set has seats for 57 first class and 345 second class passengers, with a buffet/bar and three four-seat business or family compartments.

Polish state railways PKP originally ordered 16 Pendolinos in 1998, but the order was cancelled in 2000 due to a shortage of funds.

In 2010 Alstom was the only company bidding on a PKP Intercity tender for high-speed trains, with an offer of 20 New Pendolino trains. They will be equipped to work on 25 kV 50 Hz AC, 15 kV 16.7 Hz AC and 3 kV DC, and thus able to operate in Poland, Germany, Austria and the Czech Republic.

On 30 May 2011 the Polish state railways PKP signed an agreement with Alstom for 20 New Pendolinos for delivery in 2014. The first Pendolino was delivered on August 12, 2013. The trains won't have tilting capability. The Pendolinos were to operate on the high-speed CMK Central Rail Line from Kraków/Katowice to Warsaw, and on the routes from Gdynia to Warsaw and from Wrocław to Warsaw.

High-speed tests using the new Pendolino ED250 on the CMK Central Rail Line began in November 2013. On the first day of tests, November 16, the Pendolino reached 242 km/h (150 mph). On 17 November 2013 a new speed record for Polish railways was set at km 184.000 of Polish Line No. 4 when Pendolino ED250 reached a speed of 291 km/h (181 mph), breaking the 19-year record of 250.1 km/h (155 mph). On 24 November 2013 the final day of tests on the CMK Central Rail Line the Pendolino reached 293 km/h (182 mph).

=== Dispute between Alstom and Polish Railways PKP ===
The contract between the Polish operator PKP Intercity and Alstom called for the first eight Pendolino ED250 trainsets to be delivered on 6 May 2014, tested ('homologated') for operation at 250 km/h (155 mph) using European Train Control System Level 2 signalling. The tests had not been performed by May, and PKP announced that Alstom had failed to meet the contract terms and would be charged penalties as of May 6. Alstom responded that homologation in Poland at 250 km/h using ETCS Level 2 was impossible, since ETCS Level 2 was not operational anywhere in Poland, and the Central Rail Line (Poland) where the first ED250 Pendolino had reached 293 km/h in testing was equipped with ETCS Level 1, not Level 2. On 26 June 2014 a compromise was reached between PKP and Alstom under which the Pendolinos would be delivered under a two-stage homologation, first homologated for operation using ETCS Level 1 and eventually to be homologated for ETCS Level 2. Pendolinos were put in service on 14 December 2014.

=== Operational status ===
Other loco-hauled services branded EIC (Express InterCity) will be switched to EIP (Express Intercity Premium) operation over the coming months, with the eventual plan envisaging 17 Pendolinos in traffic, one spare and two for maintenance. All 20 trains have now been completed, with the final set being delivered to Poland at the beginning of December. However, the first unit which was used for testing and commissioning has been returned to Savigliano for retrofitting before entering revenue service.

As well as 3 kV DC for operation in Poland, the Pendolinos are equipped with 15 kV 16 2/3 Hz and 25 kV 50 Hz and the train control systems needed to run in Germany, Austria and the Czech Republic. However, certification for international operation is not seen as a priority, as the trains are restricted to domestic services for an initial 10 years under the terms of a grant from the EU Cohesion Fund which covered 22% of the project cost.

Alstom expects to employ around 130 people at the Grochów maintenance depot, which has three covered tracks for servicing and two for maintenance. The company is using its TrainTracer health monitoring and diagnostics systems to manage the fleet, ensuring that sufficient trainsets are available for the operator. Some sets are stabled overnight at the outer termini, and cycled through the depot as required. The fleet management and pit-stop maintenance regime has been developed using experience in maintaining the Virgin Trains West Coast Class 390 Pendolino fleet in the United Kingdom, with many staff being trained in Manchester.

== See also ==
- Rail transport in Poland
- Transport in Poland
