= Dąbrówka, Gmina Drzewica =

Dąbrówka
- Village
- Location within Poland
- Coordinates: 51°27′49″N 20°26′27″E
- Country: Poland
- Voivodeship: Łódź
- County: Opoczno
- Gmina: Drzewica
- Population: 348

Dąbrówka [dɔmˈbrufka] is a village in the administrative district of Gmina Drzewica, within Opoczno County, Łódź Voivodeship, in central Poland.
