= Krzczonów, Łódź Voivodeship =

Krzczonów
- Village
- Location within Poland
- Coordinates: 51°24′N 20°25′E
- Country: Poland
- Voivodeship: Łódź
- County: Opoczno
- Gmina: Drzewica
- Population: 578

Krzczonów [ˈkʂt͡ʂɔnuf] is a village in the administrative district of Gmina Drzewica, within Opoczno County, Łódź Voivodeship, in central Poland.
