= Dúbravka, Michalovce District =

Village and municipality in Michalovce District in Slovakia

Dúbravka Dobróka
- Municipality
- Flag

- Location of Dúbravka in the Košice Region Location of Dúbravka in Slovakia
- Coordinates: 48.64°N 21.89°E
- Country: Slovakia
- Region: Košice Region
- District: Michalovce District
- First mentioned: 1409

Area
  - Total: 10.21 km^{2} (3.94 sq mi)
- Elevation: 105 m (344 ft)

Population (2025)
  - Total: 666
- Time zone: UTC+1 (CET)
  - Summer (DST): UTC+2 (CEST)
- Postal code: 721 5
- Area code: +421 56
- Vehicle registration plate (until 2022): MI
- Website: www.obecdubravka.eu

Dúbravka (Hungarian: Dobróka) is a village and municipality in Michalovce District in the Košice Region of eastern Slovakia.

== History ==
In historical records the village was first mentioned in 1409. Before the establishment of independent Czechoslovakia in 1918, it was part of Zemplén County within the Kingdom of Hungary.

== Geography ==
The municipality lies at an altitude of 105 metres (344 ft) and covers an area of 10.21 km^{2} (3.94 sq mi) (2025).

== Population ==
Population statistic (10 years)
Year	1995	2005	2015	2025
Count	706	660	687	666
Difference		−6.51%	+4.09%	−3.05%

Population statistic
Year	2024	2025
Count	663	666
Difference		+0.45%

It has a population of 666 people (31 December 2025).

=== Ethnicity ===
Census 2021 (1+ %)
Ethnicity	Number	Fraction
Slovak	645	95.69%
Not found out	18	2.67%
Rusyn	8	1.18%
Total	674	

In year 2021 was 674 people by ethnicity 645 as Slovak, 18 as Not found out, 8 as Rusyn, 5 as Hungarian, 4 as Russian, 3 as Czech, 3 as English, 2 as Other, 1 as Silesian and 1 as Bulgarian.

Note on population: The difference values of population numbers in the table "Population statistic" and in the sections "Ethnicity" & "Religion" is caused by the use of various statistical methods.

=== Religion ===
Census 2021 (1+ %)
Religion	Number	Fraction
Roman Catholic Church	318	47.18%
Greek Catholic Church	216	32.05%
Eastern Orthodox Church	50	7.42%
None	47	6.97%
Not found out	16	2.37%
Evangelical Church	11	1.63%
Calvinist Church	9	1.34%
Total	674	

In year 2021 was 674 people by religion 318 from Roman Catholic Church, 216 from Greek Catholic Church, 50 from Eastern Orthodox Church, 47 from None, 16 from Not found out, 11 from Evangelical Church, 9 from Calvinist Church, 5 from Other, 1 from Other and not ascertained christian church and 1 from Bahá'i Community.

== Government ==
The village relies on the tax and district offices, and fire brigade at Michalovce and relies on the police force at Trhovište.

== Culture ==
The village has a small public library, a post office, and a food store.

== Sports ==
The village has a football pitch.

== Transport ==
The village has a bus and railway station.

== Genealogical resources ==
The records for genealogical research are available at the state archive "Statny Archiv in Presov, Slovakia"

- Roman Catholic church records (births/marriages/deaths): 1850-1895 (parish B)
- Greek Catholic church records (births/marriages/deaths): 1756-1904 (parish A)
- Reformated church records (births/marriages/deaths): 1761-1896 (parish B)

== See also ==
- List of municipalities and towns in Slovakia
