= Dąbrówka Bytowska railway station =

Historical railway station

Coordinates: 54.1658°N 17.4103°E

Dąbrówka Bytowska

General information
- Location: Dąbrówka Bytowska; Poland
- Owner: Polskie Koleje Państwowe S.A.

Construction
- Structure type: Building: No; Depot: No; Water tower: No

History
- Former names: Damerkow (Kt. Bütow) until 1945
Location

Dąbrówka Bytowska is a non-operational PKP railway station in Dąbrówka Bytowska (Pomeranian Voivodeship), Poland.

== Lines crossing the station ==
Start station	End station	Line type
Lipusz	Korzybie	Closed
