= Radzice Małe =

- Village
- Location within Poland
- Coordinates: 51°28′N 20°24′E
- Country: Poland
- Voivodeship: Łódź
- County: Opoczno
- Gmina: Drzewica
- Population: 590

Radzice Małe [raˈd͡ʑit͡sɛ ˈmawɛ] is a village in the administrative district of Gmina Drzewica, within Opoczno County, Łódź Voivodeship, in central Poland.
