= Idzikowice, Opoczno County =

Idzikowice
- Village
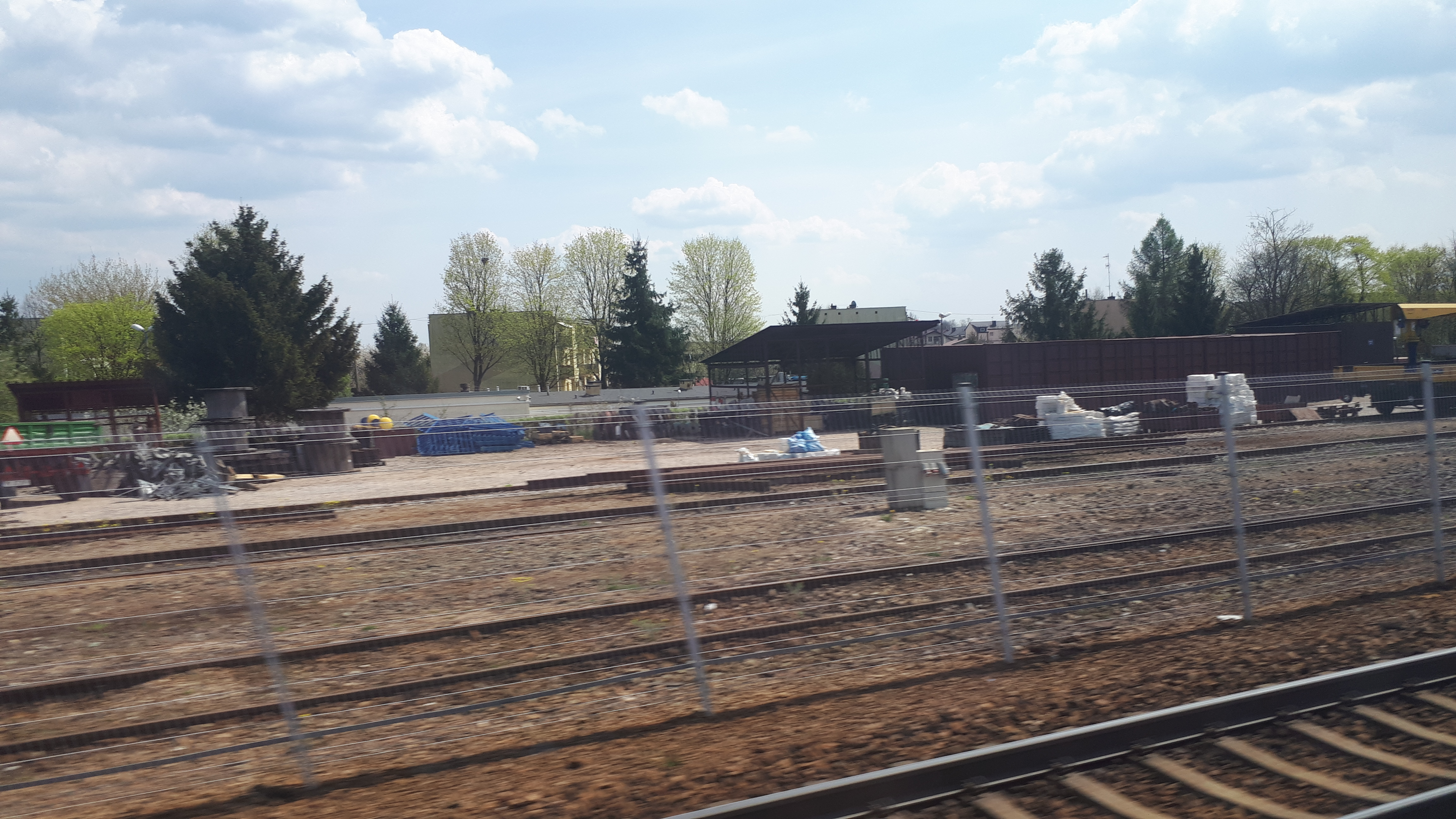
- Railway station

- Location within Poland
- Coordinates: 51°27′5″N 20°20′52″E
- Country: Poland
- Voivodeship: Łódź
- County: Opoczno
- Gmina: Drzewica

Idzikowice [id͡ʑikɔˈvit͡sɛ] is a village in the administrative district of Gmina Drzewica, within Opoczno County, Łódź Voivodeship, in central Poland.
