= Stasin, Gmina Chodel =

Stasin
- Village
- Location within Poland
- Coordinates: 51°03′11″N 22°11′55″E
- Country: Poland
- Voivodeship: Lublin
- County: Opole
- Gmina: Chodel

Stasin [ˈstaɕin] is a village in the administrative district of Gmina Chodel, within Opole County, Lublin Voivodeship, in eastern Poland. It is surrounded by Radlin, Ludwinów, Leszczyna, Ratoszyn Drugi and Kępa-Kolonia.
