= Urzędów County =

County in Lublin Voivodeship

Urzędów County (Polish: powiat urzędowski) was a powiat (county) within Lublin Voivodeship in the Polish–Lithuanian Commonwealth (16th-18th centuries). Today, Urzędów belongs to Kraśnik County.

Urzedow County was created sometime in the late 15th century, when Lublin Voivodeship was carved out of the eastern part of Sandomierz Voivodeship. The new voivodeship was made of three counties - Lukow County, Lublin County and Urzedow County, whose area in the late 16th century was 1028 sq. kilometers. Apart from Urzedow, it included such towns, as Bilgoraj, Krasnik, Janów Lubelski, Frampol, Opole Lubelskie, and Goraj. Urzedow became the seat of local administration (starosta) because, in the 15th century, sejmiks took place here.

By the second half of the 17th century, the area of Urzedow County grew to 3,293 sq. kilometers, because its boundary moved northwards, at the expense of neighboring Lublin County. At that time, such locations as Opole Lubelskie, Chodel, Ratoszyn Pierwszy, Wilkolaz and Bychawa were annexed into Urzedow County.

The largest town of the county was Krasnik, whose population in the mid 17th century reached over 4,000 people, which made it second largest city of the voivodeship, after Lublin (with a population of 10,000 people). At the same time, Urzedow had a population of 2,000 people.

Urzedow County was disbanded after the third partition of Poland (1795). In the Duchy of Warsaw and Russian-controlled Congress Poland, most of its territory belonged to Krasnik County and Bilgoraj County.
