= Elzbieta =

Elżbieta [ɛlʐˈbjɛta] or Elžbieta may refer to:

- Elżbieta, Lublin Voivodeship, a village in eastern Poland
- Elżbieta-Kolonia, a village in eastern Poland
- Elżbieta, a Polish given name equivalent to Elizabeth
  - Elżbieta Penderecka (1947–2025), Polish cultural activist
- Elžbieta, a Lithuanian given name equivalent to Elizabeth
