= Kamieński =

Kamieński (feminine: Kamieńska) is a Polish surname. Notable people with the surname include:

- Anna Kamieńska (1920–1986), Polish poet, writer, translator and literary critic
- Anna Kamieńska-Łapińska (1932–2007), Polish sculptor and animated-film scenarist.
- Antoni Kamieński (1860–1933), Polish painter, illustrator and engraver
- Franciszek Kamieński (1851–1912), Polish botanist
- Henryk Ignacy Kamieński (1777–1831), Polish brigadier general
- Henryk Michał Kamieński (1813–1865), Polish philosopher
- Kazimierz Kamieński (1919–1953), officer of the Polish Army
- Maciej Kamieński (1734–1821), Polish classical composer

== Places ==
- Kamianske, city now in Ukraine called Kamieński in Polish
- Zalew Kamieński
- Powiat kamieński
- Kopanina Kamieńska
- Wola Kamieńska
- Wysoka Kamieńska
- adjective for places name Kamień

== See also ==
- Kamiński
