= Ruda Maciejowska =

- Village
- Location within Poland
- Coordinates: 51°8′36″N 22°3′26″E
- Country: Poland
- Voivodeship: Lublin
- County: Opole
- Gmina: Opole Lubelskie
- Population: 74

Ruda Maciejowska [ˈruda mat͡ɕɛˈjɔfska] is a village in the administrative district of Gmina Opole Lubelskie, within Opole County, Lublin Voivodeship, in eastern Poland.
