= Uściąż =

- Village
- Location within Poland
- Coordinates: 51°18′N 22°0′E
- Country: Poland
- Voivodeship: Lublin
- County: Opole
- Gmina: Karczmiska

Uściąż [ˈuɕt͡ɕɔ̃ʂ] is a village in the administrative district of Gmina Karczmiska, within Opole County, Lublin Voivodeship, in eastern Poland.
