= Kępa Chotecka =

- Village
- Location within Poland
- Coordinates: 51°14′25″N 21°49′35″E
- Country: Poland
- Voivodeship: Lublin
- County: Opole
- Gmina: Wilków
- Population (approx.): 200

Kępa Chotecka [ˈkɛmpa xɔˈtɛt͡ska] is a village in the administrative district of Gmina Wilków, within Opole County, Lublin Voivodeship, in eastern Poland.
