= Świdry, Gmina Opole Lubelskie =

Świdry
- Village
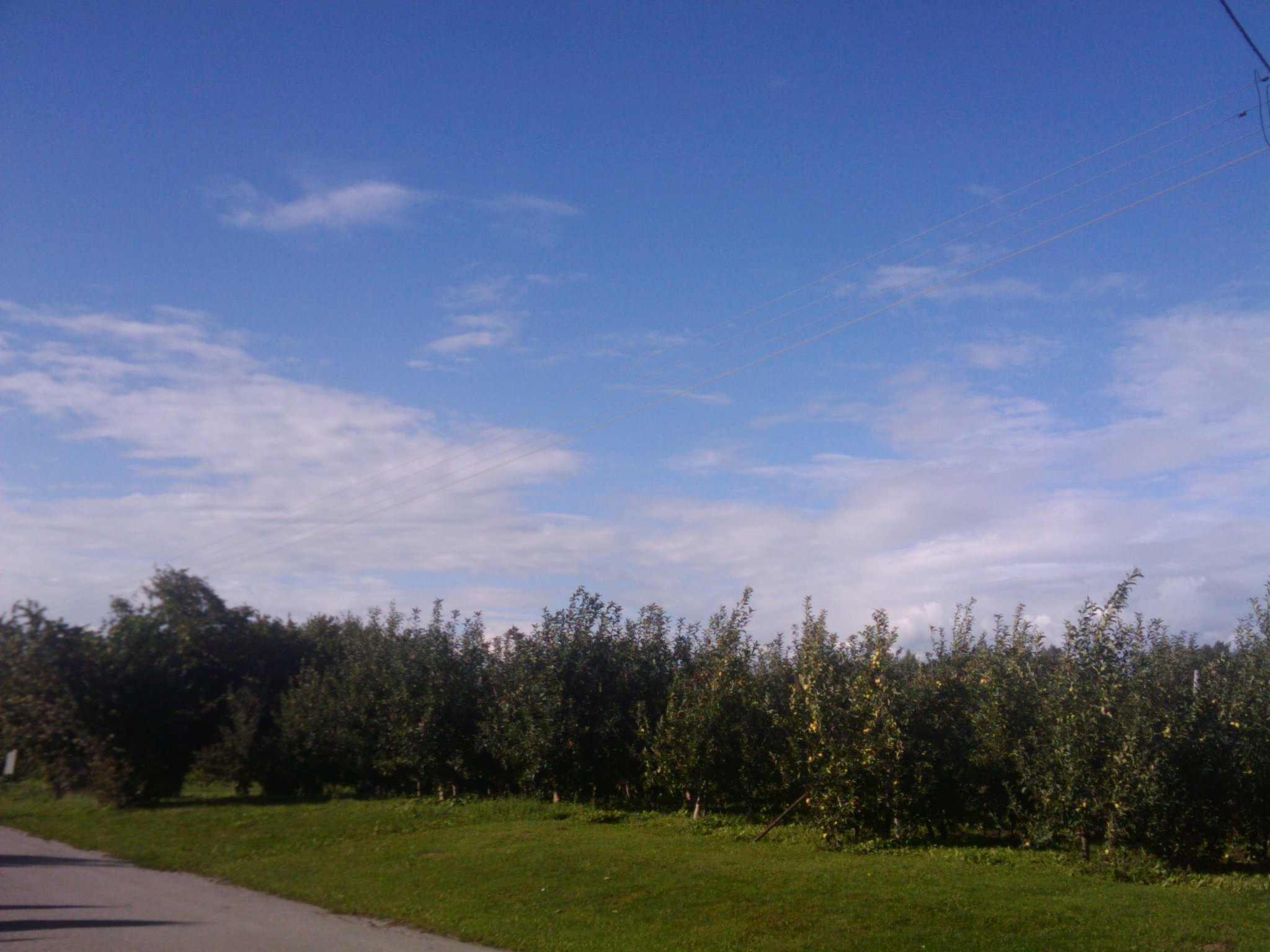

- Location within Poland
- Coordinates: 51°4′N 21°55′E
- Country: Poland
- Voivodeship: Lublin
- County: Opole
- Gmina: Opole Lubelskie

Population
  - Total: 122
- Time zone: UTC+1 (CET)
  - Summer (DST): UTC+2 (CEST)

Świdry (Polish pronunciation: [ˈɕfidrɨ]) is a village in the administrative district of Gmina Opole Lubelskie, within Opole County, Lublin Voivodeship, in eastern Poland.

== History ==
Nine Polish citizens were murdered by Nazi Germany in the village during World War II.
