= Huta Borowska =

- Village
- Location within Poland
- Coordinates: 51°8′N 22°11′E
- Country: Poland
- Voivodeship: Lublin
- County: Opole
- Gmina: Chodel

Huta Borowska [ˈxuta bɔˈrɔfska] is a village in the administrative district of Gmina Chodel, within Opole County, Lublin Voivodeship, in eastern Poland.
