= Kopanina Kaliszańska =

- Village
- Location within Poland
- Coordinates: 51°6′N 21°52′E
- Country: Poland
- Voivodeship: Lublin
- County: Opole
- Gmina: Łaziska
- Population: 198

Kopanina Kaliszańska [kɔpaˈnina kaliˈʂaɲska] is a village in the administrative district of Gmina Łaziska, within Opole County, Lublin Voivodeship, in eastern Poland.
