= Uściąż-Kolonia =

- Village
- Location within Poland
- Coordinates: 51°17′6″N 21°57′43″E
- Country: Poland
- Voivodeship: Lublin
- County: Opole
- Gmina: Karczmiska

Uściąż-Kolonia [ˈuɕt͡ɕɔ̃ʂ kɔˈlɔɲa] is a village in the administrative district of Gmina Karczmiska, within Opole County, Lublin Voivodeship, in eastern Poland.
