= Antonówka, Lublin Voivodeship =

Antonówka
- Village
- Location within Poland
- Coordinates: 51°6′N 22°5′E
- Country: Poland
- Voivodeship: Lublin
- County: Opole
- Gmina: Chodel
- Population: 90

Antonówka [antɔˈnufka] is a village in the administrative district of Gmina Chodel, within Opole County, Lublin Voivodeship, in eastern Poland.
