= Głusko Małe =

- Village
- Location within Poland
- Coordinates: 51°12′11″N 22°00′27″E
- Country: Poland
- Voivodeship: Lublin
- County: Opole
- Gmina: Karczmiska

Głusko Małe [ˈɡwuskɔ ˈmawɛ] is a village in the administrative district of Gmina Karczmiska, within Opole County, Lublin Voivodeship, in eastern Poland.
