= Dąbrowa Wronowska =

- Village
- Location within Poland
- Coordinates: 51°09′43″N 22°06′10″E
- Country: Poland
- Voivodeship: Lublin
- County: Opole
- Gmina: Poniatowa

Dąbrowa Wronowska [dɔmˈbrɔva vrɔˈnɔfska] is a village in the administrative district of Gmina Poniatowa, within Opole County, Lublin Voivodeship, in eastern Poland.
