= Dobre, Lublin Voivodeship =

Dobre
- Village
- Location within Poland
- Coordinates: 51°17′N 21°54′E
- Country: Poland
- Voivodeship: Lublin
- County: Opole
- Gmina: Wilków

Dobre [ˈdɔbrɛ] is a village in the administrative district of Gmina Wilków, within Opole County, Lublin Voivodeship, in eastern Poland.
