= Kępa Solecka =

- Village
- Location within Poland
- Coordinates: 51°9′N 21°49′E
- Country: Poland
- Voivodeship: Lublin
- County: Opole
- Gmina: Łaziska
- Population: 93

Kępa Solecka [ˈkɛmpa sɔˈlɛt͡ska] is a village in the administrative district of Gmina Łaziska, within Opole County, Lublin Voivodeship, in eastern Poland. Until 2005 it was part of Gmina Solec nad Wisłą in Masovian Voivodeship.
