= Podgórz, Lublin Voivodeship =

Podgórz
- Village
- Location within Poland
- Coordinates: 51°18′N 21°54′E
- Country: Poland
- Voivodeship: Lublin
- County: Opole
- Gmina: Wilków

Podgórz [ˈpɔdɡuʂ] is a village in the administrative district of Gmina Wilków, in Opole County, Lublin Voivodeship, in eastern Poland.
