= Zajączków, Lublin Voivodeship =

Zajączków
- Village
- Location within Poland
- Coordinates: 51°10′N 22°0′E
- Country: Poland
- Voivodeship: Lublin
- County: Opole
- Gmina: Opole Lubelskie

Zajączków [zaˈjɔnt͡ʂkuf] is a village in the administrative district of Gmina Opole Lubelskie, within Opole County, Lublin Voivodeship, in eastern Poland.
