= Kosiorów, Gmina Łaziska =

Kosiorów
- Village
- Location within Poland
- Coordinates: 51°06′48″N 21°52′59″E
- Country: Poland
- Voivodeship: Lublin
- County: Opole
- Gmina: Łaziska

Kosiorów [kɔˈɕɔruf] is a village in the administrative district of Gmina Łaziska, within Opole County, Lublin Voivodeship, in eastern Poland.
