= Wandalin, Lublin Voivodeship =

Wandalin
- Village
- Location within Poland
- Coordinates: 51°4′N 22°1′E
- Country: Poland
- Voivodeship: Lublin
- County: Opole
- Gmina: Opole Lubelskie

Population
  - Total: 697
- Time zone: UTC+1 (CET)
  - Summer (DST): UTC+2 (CEST)

Wandalin [vanˈdalin] is a village in the administrative district of Gmina Opole Lubelskie, within Opole County, Lublin Voivodeship, in eastern Poland.

== History ==
Nine Polish citizens were murdered by Nazi Germany in the village during World War II.
