= Kolonia-Kamień =

- Village
- Location within Poland
- Coordinates: 51°07′19″N 21°50′08″E
- Country: Poland
- Voivodeship: Lublin
- County: Opole
- Gmina: Łaziska
- Population: 60

Kolonia-Kamień (Polish pronunciation: [kɔˈlɔɲa ˈkamjɛj̃]) is a village in the administrative district of Gmina Łaziska, within Opole County, Lublin Voivodeship, in eastern Poland.
