= Stanisławów, Gmina Opole Lubelskie =

Stanisławów
- Village
- Location within Poland
- Coordinates: 51°5′N 22°1′E
- Country: Poland
- Voivodeship: Lublin
- County: Opole
- Gmina: Opole Lubelskie

Stanisławów [staniˈswavuf] is a village in the administrative district of Gmina Opole Lubelskie, within Opole County, Lublin Voivodeship, in eastern Poland.
