= Kraczewice Prywatne =

- Village
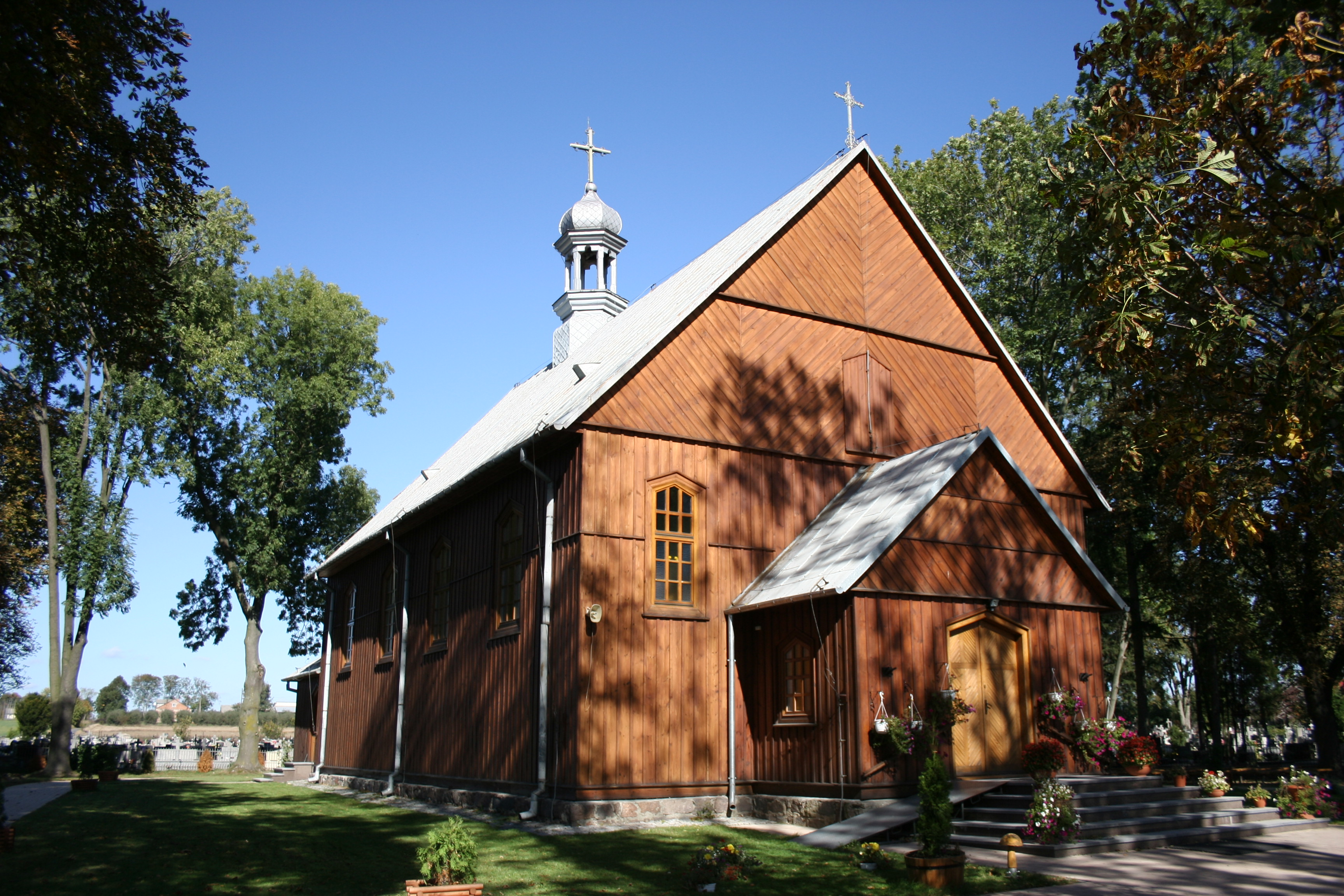

- Location within Poland
- Coordinates: 51°12′06″N 22°06′00″E
- Country: Poland
- Voivodeship: Lublin
- County: Opole
- Gmina: Poniatowa

Population
  - Total: 1,000

Kraczewice Prywatne [krat͡ʂɛˈvit͡sɛ prɨˈvatnɛ] is a village in the administrative district of Gmina Poniatowa, within Opole County, Lublin Voivodeship, in eastern Poland.
