= Braciejowice =

- Village
- Location within Poland
- Coordinates: 51°11′N 21°50′E
- Country: Poland
- Voivodeship: Lublin
- County: Opole
- Gmina: Łaziska
- Website: http://www.braciejowice.prv.pl

Braciejowice [brat͡ɕɛjɔˈvit͡sɛ] is a village in the administrative district of Gmina Łaziska, within Opole County, Lublin Voivodeship, in eastern Poland.
