= Franciszek Duchiński =

Polish ethnographer and historian (1816–1893)

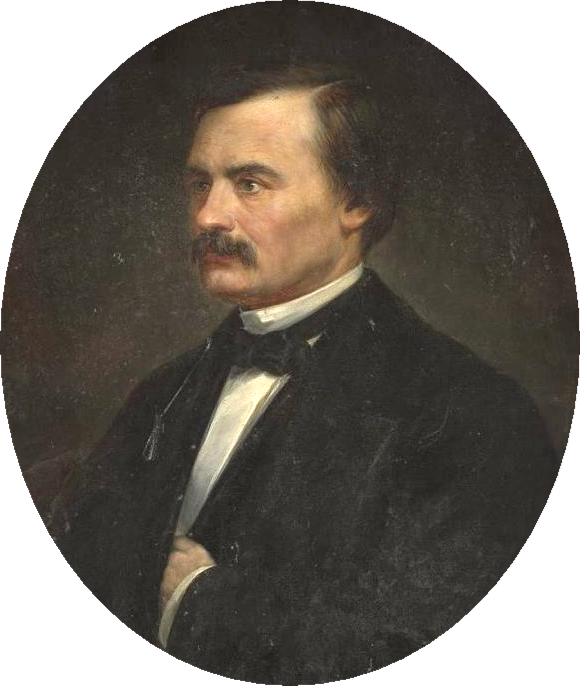
- Portrait by Jan Mioduszewski
- Born: 1816
- Died: 13 July 1893 (aged 77)
- Occupations: ethnographer, historian
- Spouse: Sewereyna Żuchowska (m. 1816; died 1893)

Franciszek Henryk Duchiński (1816 – 13 July 1893) was a Polish ethnographer and historian, often described as Ukrainophilic.

Duchiński was president of the Société d'Anthropologie et d'Ethnographie Polonaise de Paris, and moreover a member of the French Société d'Anthropologie de Paris and vice-president of the Société d'Ethnographie. He also co-organised exhibitions of anthropological sciences. Today he is mainly known as the author of the theory of the non-Slavic origin of the Russians.

== Biography ==
Duchiński was born in to an impoverished Polish noble family of Franciszek Duchiński and Zofia Bojarska, in the Right-Bank Ukraine. After father's death, his mother worked to support the family as a governess for the Tyszkiewicz counts. He attended schools in Berdychiv and Uman. He then settled in Kiev, where he worked as a private teacher in the homes of Polish aristocrats. According to his own account he started studies at the Historico-Philological Faculty of the Kiev University. In 1846, he left Ukraine for Paris, where he became associated with the political and intellectual circles of Prince Adam Czartoryski and published in the "Trzeci Maj" journal.

During the revolution of 1848, he served as Czartoryski's plenipotentiary in Italy, moving to Istanbul a year later. It was during this period that he began writing his first amateur works on Russian and Ukrainian history. He lived there until 1855, when he settled again in Paris. He then developed his journalistic activities, working as a teacher at the Higher Polish School. Due to the intervention of the Russian embassy in 1865, he could not give public lectures, so he limited himself to writing. He became a member of the French geographical and ethnographic societies, the latter of which he became vice-president in 1871. He co-edited the journal Actes de la Société d'Ethnographie. In 1872 he moved to Switzerland, where he became director of the Polish Museum in Rapperswil. He failed to take up a chair at the Jagiellonian University in Kraków. He published in Polish and Ukrainian journals and founded the ephemeral Przegląd Etnograficzny. In 1878, he was one of the founders and became a president of Société d'Anthropologie et d'Ethnographie Polonaise de Paris, and co-organised the Polish exposition at the Exposition Universelle in Paris. In 1885, he celebrated 25 years of scientific work in Lviv. Duchiński died on 13 July 1893 and was buried at the Polish cemetery in Montmorency.

On 26 November 1864 he married Polish poet and translator Seweryna Żochowska, they didn't have children.

== Theory on the non-Slavic origin of the Russians ==
Duchiński was born in Ukrainian lands, and spent much of his life in Kyiv, with which he was deeply connected; he even used the nickname Kijowianin (Kyivianin). He was among the Ukrainophiles, Polish intellectuals who studied and promoted Ukrainian culture. An important goal of his research was to work for the liberation and unification of Poland and Rus'/Ukraine.

In Duchiński's writing, the thesis of the non-Slavic anthropological origin of the Russians occupied a prominent place as a kind of idee fixe. Duchiński rejected the division of peoples into large groups in terms of language, and postulated the use of anthropological features. Duchiński divided the white race into two groups of Aryans and Turans. The former included Slavs, Germans and Latins (Polish: Latyni), and were to be characterised by a sedentary lifestyle, love of freedom and homeland, farming as their main occupation, respect for the law, creativity, a rational approach, and respect for women. The Turans, on the other hand, which he included the Turks, Finns and Mongols, had no love of the land, were passive, fanatical, organised in a military way, and the position of women in their societies was low. According to Duchiński, peoples of Turan origin, although seemingly leading a civilised, sedentary lifestyle today, nevertheless retained the tendencies of the nomads of old.

The Russians, whom he called Muscovites (Polish: Moskale), Duchiński considered to be representatives of the Turans. They had nothing in common with the Ruthenians, having only undergone a ruthenisation during the Kievan Rus' period, which was brought to an end by the Mongol invasion (1237–1242), which united the Turan peoples living on both sides of the Urals, and also separated the Turans from the European-Aryans. He believed that the Muscovites were physically different from the Ruthenians and that it's not possible to Europeanise Russia.

=== Sources ===
Duchiński's theory was deeply rooted in the tradition of Polish historiosophical thought, in which the desire to make Europe realize that Russia was not only fundamentally different from it in terms of civilization, but even hostile, was a key element. This was not only to explain the cause of Poland's decline, but also to show the relevance of Poland in the fight against this threat and the necessity of its revival.

=== Reception in France ===
Duchiński was not an anonymous researcher, but was well-known and active in the Parisian and French scientific world. His theories influenced and were adopted by some French researchers, and became a component of French Russophobia, which increased after a brutal crushing of the Polish January Uprising of 1863 by Russian forces. French historian Marlène Laruelle lists among the researchers who adopted the 'Turan' thesis: Henri Martin, Albert Reville, Auguste Viquesnel, Charlier de Steinbach, Casimir Delamarre, Édouard Talbot, Emmanuel Henri Victurnien de Noailles, Élias Regnault and others. Duchiński actively promoted his theses to French authors. They extensively used works and data collected by Duchiński, often copying them directly, often without citing the source. It is possible that Duchiński himself wrote some of their texts, which they published under their own names. This happened because Duchiński was interested in spreading his theories as widely as possible, and also because he feared persecution from the Russian authorities.

Henri Martin was previously convinced of the Slavic nature of the Russians, although he changed his view after the January Uprising and under influence of Duchiński. He called for the development of a European patriotism which aim should be rebuilding of Poland and resistance to the Russian invasion of the West. Martin criticised the name of 'Slavic literature' chair at the Collège de France that was created for Adam Mickiewicz in 1840. Martin argued there was no linguistic or cultural unity between Slavs and Russians. Casimir Delamarre supported him and in 1868 launched a petition asking to change the title. Eventually, the name of the chair was changed to 'Slavic literatures'. Henri Martin repeated most of Duchiński's theses in hisbook La Russie et l'Europe, published in 1866.

Duchiński's work was also an inspiration for biologist Jean-Louis Armand de Quatrefages de Bréau, who, influenced by the defeat in the Franco-Prussian War, published his work La Race prussienne in 1871. Like Duchiński with regard to the Russians, Quatrefages regarded the Prussians as an alien, brutal race that enslaved the Germans 'through the plea of a (pretended) unity of race'. The racial distinctiveness of the Prussians was due to their Slavo-Finnic origin. Duchiński was unable to accept this view, which he expressed at a meeting of the Geographical Society held on 19 April 1872, of which Quatrefages was also a member. Duchiński, however, accepted Quatrefages' main assumptions and assessed that Russian Pan-Slavism and Prussian Pan-Germanism were nothing but a tool legitimizing ruthless conquest.

=== Reception in Russia ===
The first response to Duchiński's theses, critical of course, was a polemical review of Adolphe d'Avril's 1863 work La Pologne, ses anciennes provinces et ses véritables limites, written by Mikhail Pogodin. He treated Duchiński's theory simply as an expression of Poles' dislike of Russians, and explained any possible similarities between Russians and Finns simply by similar living conditions. Viktor Stepanovich Poroshin wrote in a similar vein.

=== Reception in Poland ===
Among Polish intellectuals, Duchiński found both ardent supporters and staunch opponents. The first group certainly included Galician Stefan Buszczyński, who wrote several works in Polish and German in which he enthusiastically promoted Duchiński's theses. Duchiński's works were particularly popular before the January Uprising, when they could reach the country more easily, and promoted the unity of fate of the peoples of Poland, Ruthenia and Lithuania, which became the basis of the revolutionary movement. On the other hand, first main opponent of Duchiński was Henryk Kamieński, who published a critical review of his theory.

From the beginning, however, Duchiński's ideas found their critics in Poland. Their number increased after the collapse of January Uprising. In 1881, Wacław Nałkowski published a pamphlet entitled On geographical errors on which Professor Duchiński's ideas are based; in which he attacked Duchiński's theses, especially the one proclaiming that the Dnieper River is an anthropological border. Nałkowski referred to Duchiński's worldview contemptuously as 'duchinizm' (duchinism) or 'duchiniczność' (duchinishness). Jan Baudouin de Courtenay's criticism of the use of science in promoting political views was similar, equating Duchiński's work with that of Russian Slavophiles.

=== Reception in Germany ===
Duchiński's theories came to Germany through a pamphlet published in 1869 by Delamarre, translated by Charlier de Steinbach. They were well received by some German scholars. One of them was Gottfried Kinkel, who published two works under their influence. Thesis about the lack of common ancestry between Ukrainians, who were living in Austrian Eastern Galicia, and Russians was well received in Austria; its reception can be found in the works of Hermann Ignaz Bidermann, among others. Karl Marx also spoke favorably of Duchiński's theory. On the other hand, German geographer Johann-Heinrich Schnitzler summed up Duchiński's ideas simply as justification of Polish claims towards Ruthenia.

=== Reception in Ukraine ===
Duchiński's theories had a major impact on the development of Ukrainian national consciousness, as they clearly separated Ukrainians from Russians. Therefore, they were quite quickly adopted by Ukrainian intellectuals. However, this does not mean that every Duchiński thesis was accepted uncritically. For example, Myhailo Drahomanov was negative about Duchynsky's view of the Turan origin of the Cossacks.

== Bibliography ==
- Abramowicz, Andrzej (1975). "Société d'Anthropologie et d'Ethnographie Polonaise de Paris (1878-?)" (PDF). Kwartalnik Historii Nauki I Techniki (in Polish). 20 (1): 79–88.
- Górny, Maciej (2014). "'Five great armies against our enemies'. A comparative study in the history of racism". Kwartalnik Historyczny. 121 (Special issue): 95–121. doi:10.12775/KH.2014.121.SI.1.04.
- Laruelle, Marléne (2004). "La Question du "touranisme" des Russes. Contribution à une histoire des échanges intellectuels en Allemagne — France — Russie au XIe siècle". Cahiers du Monde russe. 45 (1/2): 241–265. JSTOR 20174851.
- Rudnytsky, Ivan L. (1980). "Franciszek Duchiński and His Impact on Ukrainian Political Thought". Harvard Ukrainian Studies. 3/4 (2): 690–705. JSTOR 41035865.
  - Online reprint in Rudnytsky, Ivan L. (1988). "Franciszek Duchiński and His Impact on Ukrainian Political Thought". Essays in Modern Ukrainian History. Cambridge, Massachusetts: Harvard University Press. pp. 187–202. ISBN 9780916458195.
- Wrzesińska, Katarzyna (2015). "Ariowie i Turańczycy. Poglądy Franciszka H. Duchińskiego na temat rasy i cywilizacji". Sprawy Narodowościowe. Seria Nowa. 46 (46): 46–63. doi:10.11649/sn.2015.033.
- Media related to Franciszek Duchiński at Wikimedia Commons
