= Sewerynówka =

Sewerynówka may refer to the following places:

- Sewerynówka, Gmina Opole Lubelskie in Opole County, Lublin Voivodeship (east Poland)
- Sewerynówka, Parczew County in Lublin Voivodeship (east Poland)
- Sewerynówka, Masovian Voivodeship (east-central Poland)
