= Kleniewo, Lublin Voivodeship =

Kleniewo
- Settlement
- Location within Poland
- Coordinates: 51°10′23″N 21°57′28″E
- Country: Poland
- Voivodeship: Lublin
- County: Opole
- Gmina: Opole Lubelskie
- Population: 5

Kleniewo [klɛˈɲɛvɔ] is a settlement in the administrative district of Gmina Opole Lubelskie, within Opole County, Lublin Voivodeship, in eastern Poland.
