= Wilków-Kolonia =

- Village
- Location within Poland
- Coordinates: 51°15′01″N 21°50′50″E
- Country: Poland
- Voivodeship: Lublin
- County: Opole
- Gmina: Wilków

Wilków-Kolonia [ˈvilkuf kɔˈlɔɲa] is a village in the administrative district of Gmina Wilków, within Opole County, Lublin Voivodeship, in eastern Poland.

The climate in Wilków-Kolonia is similar to that of eastern Poland, with warm summers, cold winters, and a temperate continental character.

In 2021, Wilków-Kolonia had around 82 residents, with an age structure of 13.4% in pre-working age, 59.8% in working age, and 26.8% in post-working age, a gender distribution of roughly 50% male and 50% female, and the settlement previously had 33 households in 2002.
