= Rogów, Gmina Wilków =

Rogów
- Village
- Location within Poland
- Coordinates: 51°15′36″N 21°57′30″E
- Country: Poland
- Voivodeship: Lublin
- County: Opole
- Gmina: Wilków

Rogów [ˈrɔɡuf] is a village in the administrative district of Gmina Wilków, within Opole County, Lublin Voivodeship, in eastern Poland.
