= Puszno Godowskie =

- Village
- Location within Poland
- Coordinates: 51°6′N 22°4′E
- Country: Poland
- Voivodeship: Lublin
- County: Opole
- Gmina: Opole Lubelskie

Puszno Godowskie [ˈpuʂnɔ ɡɔˈdɔfskʲɛ] is a village in the administrative district of Gmina Opole Lubelskie, within Opole County, Lublin Voivodeship, in eastern Poland.
