= Stare Komaszyce =

- Village
- Location within Poland
- Coordinates: 51°06′48″N 22°04′12″E
- Country: Poland
- Voivodeship: Lublin
- County: Opole
- Gmina: Opole Lubelskie

Stare Komaszyce [ˈstarɛ kɔmaˈʂɨt͡sɛ] is a village in the administrative district of Gmina Opole Lubelskie, within Opole County, Lublin Voivodeship, in eastern Poland.
