= Zgoda, Lublin Voivodeship =

Zgoda
- Village
- Location within Poland
- Coordinates: 51°6′N 21°52′E
- Country: Poland
- Voivodeship: Lublin
- County: Opole
- Gmina: Łaziska
- Population (approx.): 250
- Website: http://www.zgoda-lubelskie.cba.pl

Zgoda [ˈzɡɔda] is a village in the administrative district of Gmina Łaziska, within Opole County, Lublin Voivodeship, in eastern Poland.
