= Wólka Polanowska =

- Village
- Location within Poland
- Coordinates: 51°15′15″N 21°54′43″E
- Country: Poland
- Voivodeship: Lublin
- County: Opole
- Gmina: Wilków

Wólka Polanowska [ˈvulka pɔlaˈnɔfska] is a village in the administrative district of Gmina Wilków, within Opole County, Lublin Voivodeship, in eastern Poland.
