= Trzciniec, Gmina Chodel =

Trzciniec
- Village
- Location within Poland
- Coordinates: 51°7′44″N 22°11′5″E
- Country: Poland
- Voivodeship: Lublin
- County: Opole
- Gmina: Chodel
- Elevation: 216 m (709 ft)

Trzciniec [ˈtʂt͡ɕiɲɛt͡s] is a village in the administrative district of Gmina Chodel, within Opole County, Lublin Voivodeship, in eastern Poland.
