= Słotwiny, Lublin Voivodeship =

Słotwiny
- Village
- Location within Poland
- Coordinates: 51°17′N 22°3′E
- Country: Poland
- Voivodeship: Lublin
- County: Opole
- Gmina: Karczmiska

Słotwiny [swɔtˈfinɨ] is a village in the administrative district of Gmina Karczmiska, within Opole County, Lublin Voivodeship, in eastern Poland.
