= Żmijowiska, Lublin Voivodeship =

Żmijowiska
- Village
- Location within Poland
- Coordinates: 51°14′N 21°54′E
- Country: Poland
- Voivodeship: Lublin
- County: Opole
- Gmina: Wilków

Żmijowiska [ʐmijɔˈviska] is a village in the administrative district of Gmina Wilków, within Opole County, Lublin Voivodeship, in eastern Poland.
