= Kluczkowice =

- Village
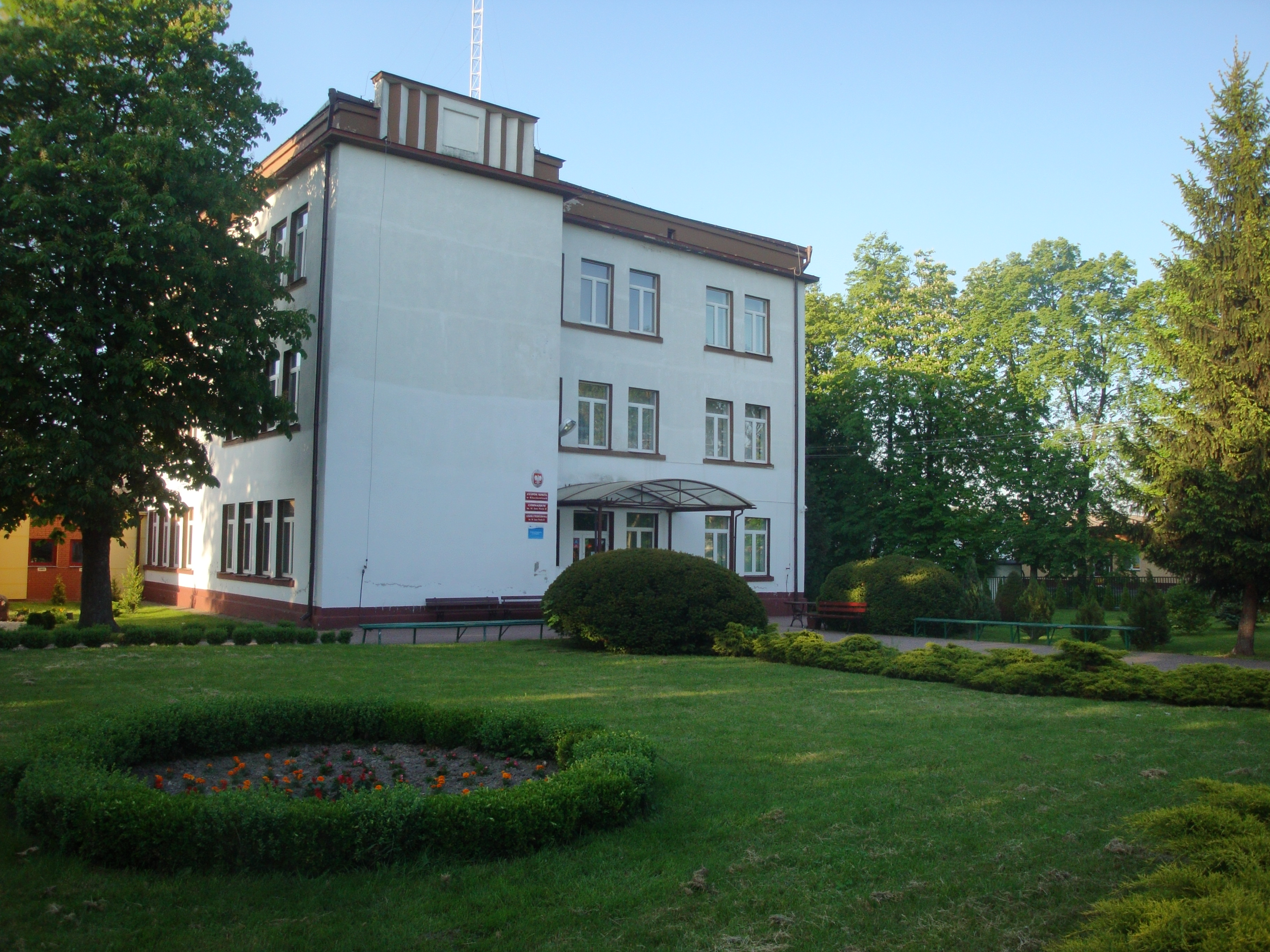

- Location within Poland
- Coordinates: 51°5′N 21°56′E
- Country: Poland
- Voivodeship: Lublin
- County: Opole
- Gmina: Opole Lubelskie
- Time zone: UTC+1 (CET)
  - Summer (DST): UTC+2 (CEST)

Kluczkowice [klut͡ʂkɔˈvit͡sɛ] is a village in the administrative district of Gmina Opole Lubelskie, within Opole County, Lublin Voivodeship, in eastern Poland.

== History ==
Four Polish citizens were murdered by Nazi Germany in the village during World War II.
