= Yenin =

Yenin is a surname. Notable people with the surname include:

- Artyom Yenin (born 1976), Russian footballer
- Ivan Yenin (born 1994), Ukrainian-Russian footballer
- Yevhen Yenin (1980–2023), Ukrainian diplomat and lawyer

== See also ==
- Henin
