= Spławy, Gmina Poniatowa =

Spławy
- Village
- Location within Poland
- Coordinates: 51°13′12″N 22°5′56″E
- Country: Poland
- Voivodeship: Lublin
- County: Opole
- Gmina: Poniatowa

Spławy [ˈspwavɨ] is a village in the administrative district of Gmina Poniatowa, within Opole County, Lublin Voivodeship, in eastern Poland.
