= Głodno, Lublin Voivodeship =

Głodno
- Village
- Location within Poland
- Coordinates: 51°11′N 21°51′E
- Country: Poland
- Voivodeship: Lublin
- County: Opole
- Gmina: Łaziska

Głodno [ˈɡwɔdnɔ] is a village in the administrative district of Gmina Łaziska, within Opole County, Lublin Voivodeship, in eastern Poland.
