= Niezdów, Lublin Voivodeship =

Niezdów
- Village
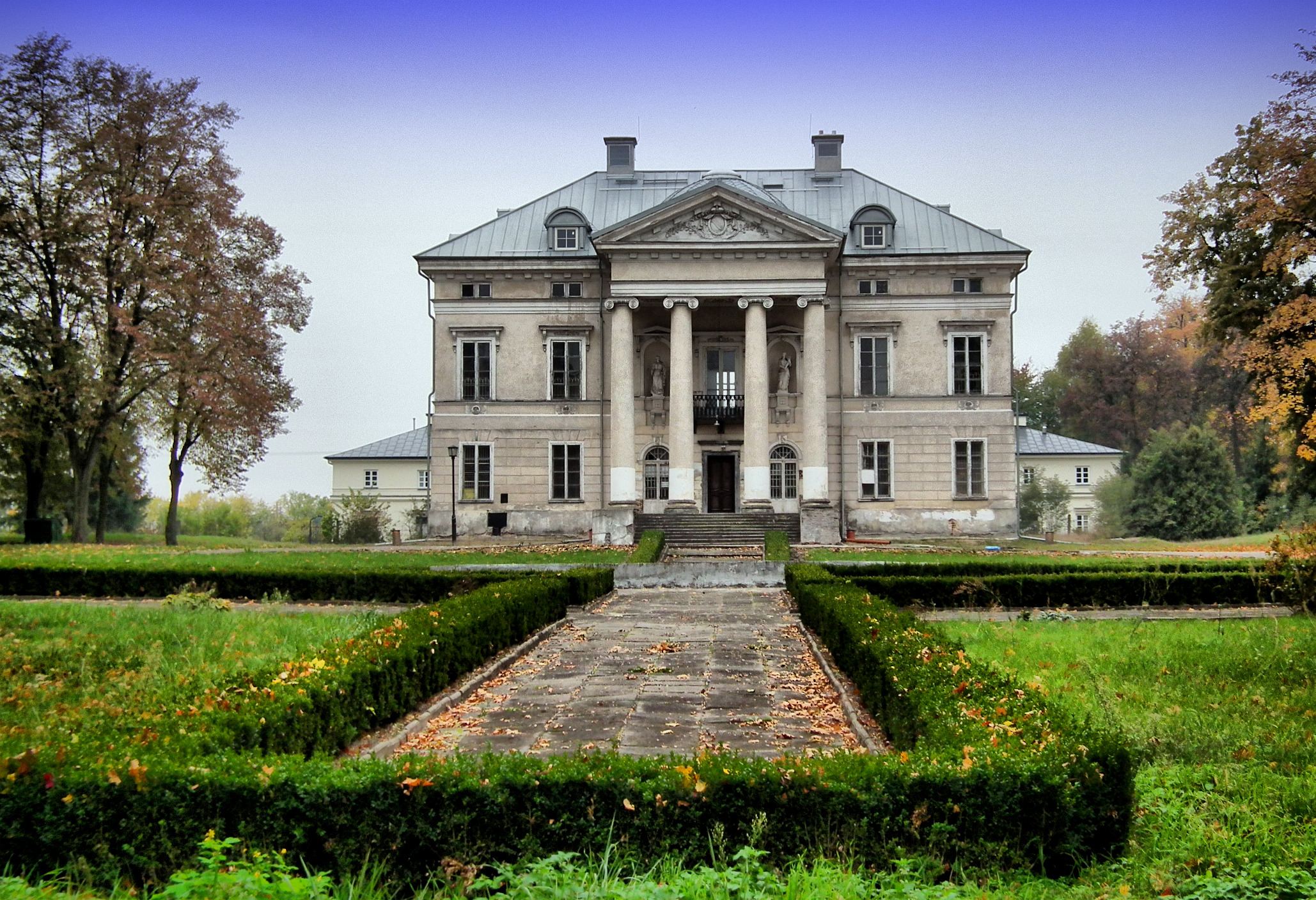
- Lubomirski Palace in Niezdów

- Location within Poland
- Coordinates: 51°10′N 21°56′E
- Country: Poland
- Voivodeship: Lublin
- County: Opole
- Gmina: Opole Lubelskie
- Time zone: UTC+1 (CET)
  - Summer (DST): UTC+2 (CEST)
- Vehicle registration: LOP

Niezdów [ˈɲɛzduf] is a village in the administrative district of Gmina Opole Lubelskie, within Opole County, Lublin Voivodeship, in eastern Poland.

== History ==
14 Polish citizens were murdered by Nazi Germany in the village during World War II.
