= Machów =

Machów may refer to:

- Machów, Lublin Voivodeship, a village in the administrative district of Gmina Wilków, Lublin Voivodeship, eastern Poland
- Machów, Tarnobrzeg, the southern part of the city of Tarnobrzeg, Podkarpackie Voivodeship, southeastern Poland
