= Borów-Kolonia =

Borów-Kolonia refers to the following places in Poland:

- Borów-Kolonia, Krasnystaw County, Lublin Voivodeship
- Borów-Kolonia, Gmina Chodel, Opole County, Lublin Voivodeship
