= Wrzelów =

- Village
- Location within Poland
- Coordinates: 51°13′N 21°51′E
- Country: Poland
- Voivodeship: Lublin
- County: Opole
- Gmina: Łaziska
- Time zone: UTC+1 (CET)
  - Summer (DST): UTC+2 (CEST)

Wrzelów [ˈvʐɛluf] is a village in the administrative district of Gmina Łaziska, within Opole County, Lublin Voivodeship, in eastern Poland.

== History ==
Nine Polish citizens were murdered by Nazi Germany in the village during World War II.
