= Kraczewice Rządowe =

- Village
- Location within Poland
- Coordinates: 51°12′11″N 22°07′03″E
- Country: Poland
- Voivodeship: Lublin
- County: Opole
- Gmina: Poniatowa

Kraczewice Rządowe [krat͡ʂɛˈvit͡sɛ ʐɔnˈdɔvɛ] is a village in the administrative district of Gmina Poniatowa, within Opole County, Lublin Voivodeship, in eastern Poland.
