= Henin =

Henin or Hénin may refer to:

== People ==
- The House of Hénin, a family of Belgian high nobility
  - Charles-Alexandre de Hénin-Liétard d'Alsace
  - Maximilien de Hénin-Liétard
  - Thierry-Arno-Baudoin-Philippe de Hénin-Liétard, Prince de Hénin and Comte d'Alsace
  - Thomas Philip Wallrad de Hénin-Liétard d'Alsace
- Étienne Félix d'Henin de Cuvillers, French mesmerism expert
- Jacky Hénin
- Jérémy Hénin
- Justine Henin, Belgian retired professional tennis player
- Nicolas Hénin, French journalist, Middle East specialist
- Roland Henin
- Valérie Hénin

== Places ==
- Hénin-Beaumont, Pas-de-Calais department, France
- Hénin-sur-Cojeul, Pas-de-Calais department, France
- Henin, Poland

== See also ==
- 11948 Justinehénin, a Themistian asteroid
- Hennin, medieval ladies' hats
