= Wolica, Gmina Karczmiska =

Wolica
- Village
- Location within Poland
- Coordinates: 51°12′48″N 22°2′0″E
- Country: Poland
- Voivodeship: Lublin
- County: Opole
- Gmina: Karczmiska
- Population: 240

Wolica [vɔˈlit͡sa] is a village in the administrative district of Gmina Karczmiska, within Opole County, Lublin Voivodeship, in eastern Poland.

In 2005 the village had a population of 240.
