= Chodlik =

- Village
- Location within Poland
- Coordinates: 51°13′N 21°56′E
- Country: Poland
- Voivodeship: Lublin
- County: Opole
- Gmina: Karczmiska

Chodlik [ˈxɔdlik] is a village in the administrative district of Gmina Karczmiska, within Opole County, Lublin Voivodeship, in eastern Poland.
