= Kowala Pierwsza =

- Village
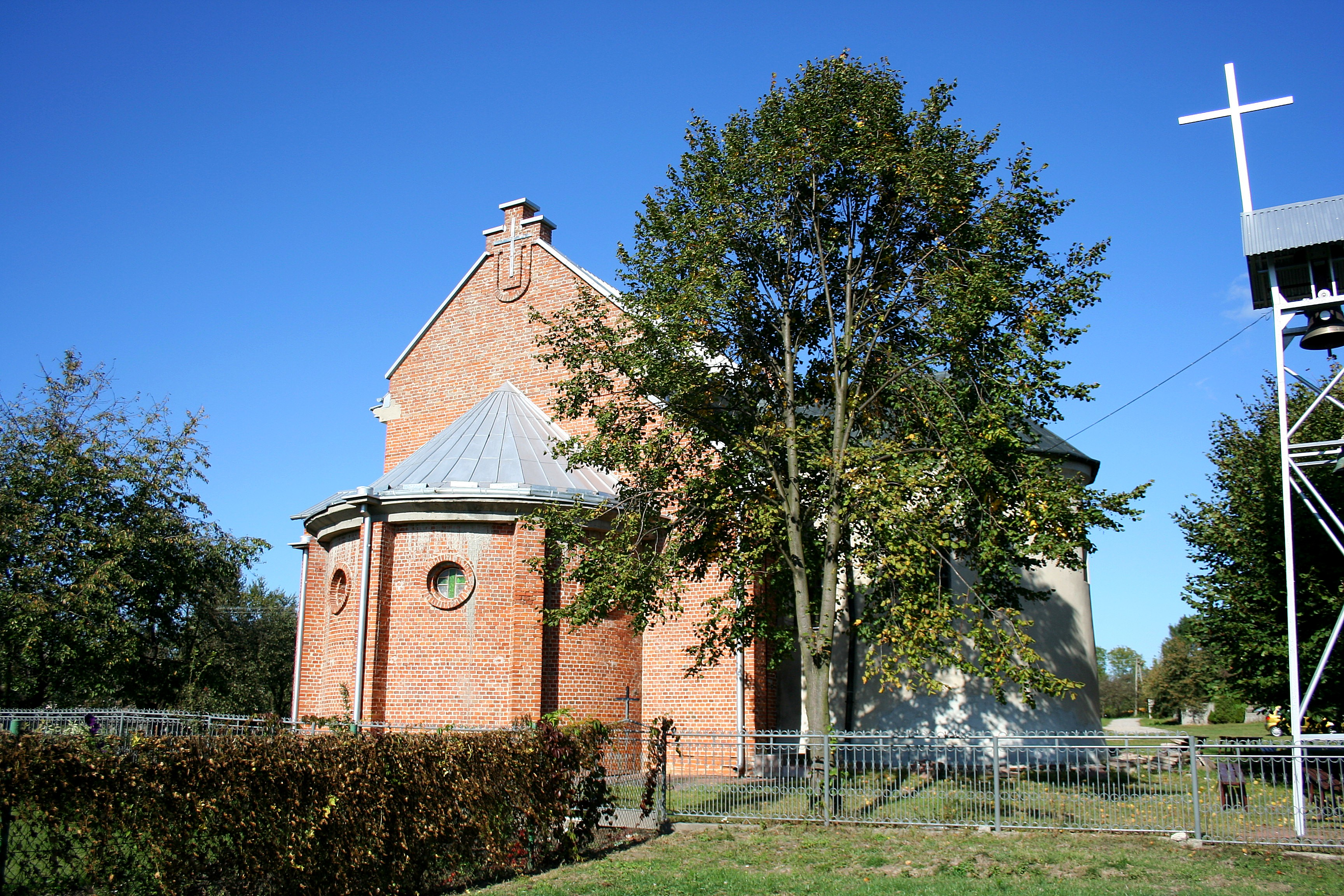

- Location within Poland
- Coordinates: 51°13′07″N 22°04′41″E
- Country: Poland
- Voivodeship: Lublin
- County: Opole
- Gmina: Poniatowa
- Time zone: UTC+1 (CET)
  - Summer (DST): UTC+2 (CEST)

Kowala Pierwsza [kɔˈvala ˈpjɛrfʂa] is a village in the administrative district of Gmina Poniatowa, within Opole County, Lublin Voivodeship, in eastern Poland.

== History ==
Three Polish citizens were murdered by Nazi Germany in the village during World War II.
