= Góry Opolskie =

- Village
- Location within Poland
- Coordinates: 51°07′20″N 21°57′48″E
- Country: Poland
- Voivodeship: Lublin
- County: Opole
- Gmina: Opole Lubelskie

Góry Opolskie [ˈɡurɨ ɔˈpɔlskʲɛ] is a village in the administrative district of Gmina Opole Lubelskie, within Opole County, Lublin Voivodeship, in eastern Poland.
