= Majdany, Lublin Voivodeship =

Majdany
- Village
- Location within Poland
- Coordinates: 51°13′9″N 21°49′43″E
- Country: Poland
- Voivodeship: Lublin
- County: Opole
- Gmina: Wilków

Majdany (Polish pronunciation: [majˈdanɨ]) is a village in the administrative district of Gmina Wilków, within Opole County, Lublin Voivodeship, in eastern Poland.
