= Piotrawin-Kolonia =

- Village
- Location within Poland
- Coordinates: 51°6′39″N 21°49′21″E
- Country: Poland
- Voivodeship: Lublin
- County: Opole
- Gmina: Łaziska

Piotrawin-Kolonia [pjɔˈtravin kɔˈlɔɲa] is a village in the administrative district of Gmina Łaziska, within Opole County, Lublin Voivodeship, in eastern Poland.
