= Osiny, Gmina Chodel =

Osiny
- Village
- Location within Poland
- Coordinates: 51°8′34″N 22°10′28″E
- Country: Poland
- Voivodeship: Lublin
- County: Opole
- Gmina: Chodel
- Elevation: 232 m (761 ft)

Osiny [ɔˈɕinɨ] is a village in the administrative district of Gmina Chodel, within Opole County, Lublin Voivodeship, in eastern Poland.
