= Grądy, Lublin Voivodeship =

Grądy
- Village
- Location within Poland
- Coordinates: 51°5′36″N 22°12′33″E
- Country: Poland
- Voivodeship: Lublin
- County: Opole
- Gmina: Chodel

Grądy [ˈɡrɔndɨ] is a village in the administrative district of Gmina Chodel, within Opole County, Lublin Voivodeship, in eastern Poland.
