= Zagłoba, Lublin Voivodeship =

Zagłoba
- Village
- Location within Poland
- Coordinates: 51°13′N 21°52′E
- Country: Poland
- Voivodeship: Lublin
- County: Opole
- Gmina: Wilków

Zagłoba [zaˈɡwɔba] is a village in the administrative district of Gmina Wilków, within Opole County, Lublin Voivodeship, in eastern Poland.

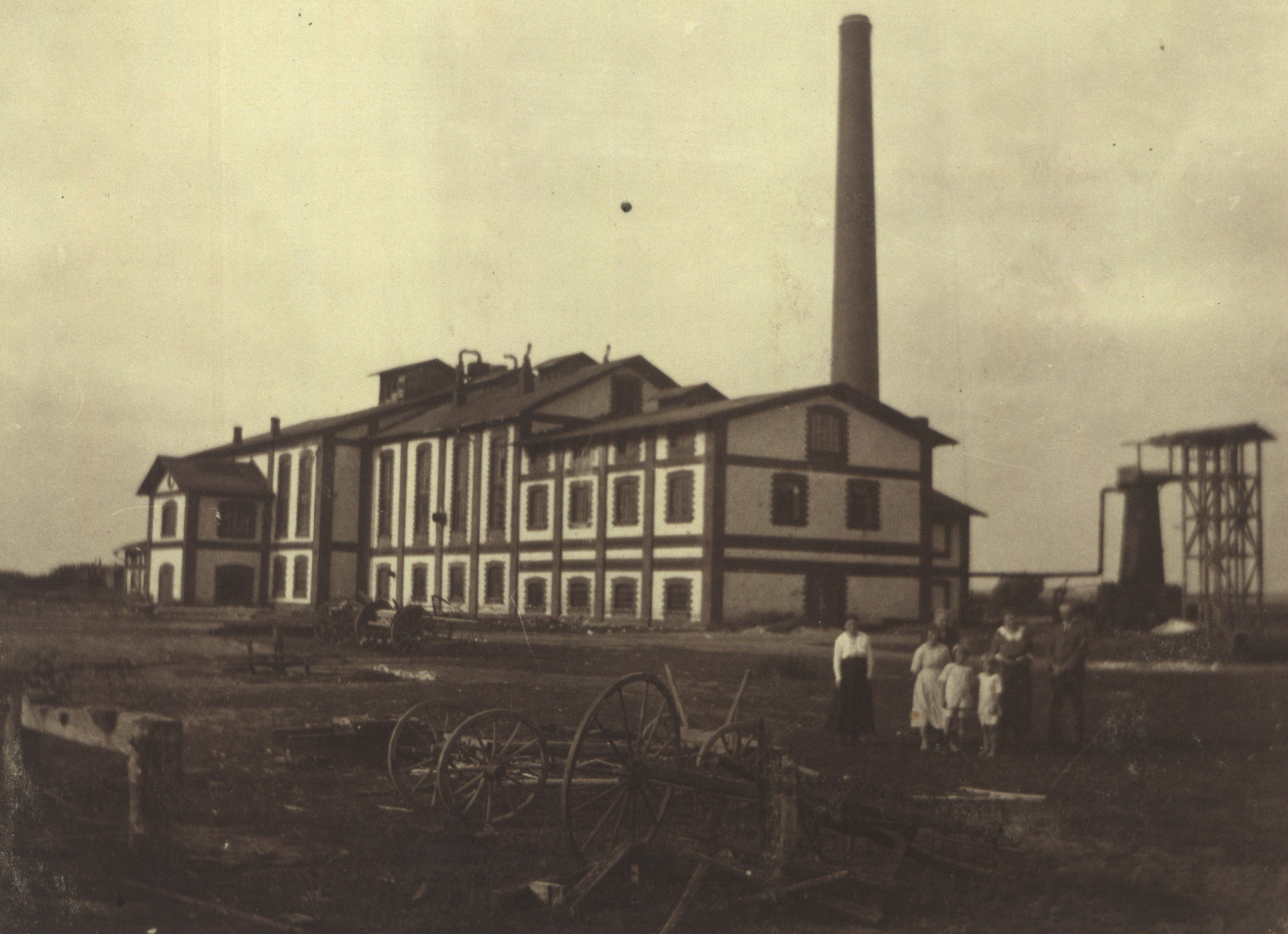
Sugar factory, 1923
