= Kosiorów, Gmina Wilków =

Kosiorów
- Village
- Location within Poland
- Coordinates: 51°13′27″N 21°53′36″E
- Country: Poland
- Voivodeship: Lublin
- County: Opole
- Gmina: Wilków

Kosiorów [kɔˈɕɔruf] is a village in the administrative district of Gmina Wilków, within Opole County, Lublin Voivodeship, in eastern Poland.
