= Dąbrowa Godowska =

- Village
- Location within Poland
- Coordinates: 51°04′31″N 22°03′48″E
- Country: Poland
- Voivodeship: Lublin
- County: Opole
- Gmina: Opole Lubelskie
- Time zone: UTC+1 (CET)
  - Summer (DST): UTC+2 (CEST)

Dąbrowa Godowska [dɔmˈbrɔva ɡɔˈdɔfska] is a village in the administrative district of Gmina Opole Lubelskie, within Opole County, Lublin Voivodeship, in eastern Poland.

== History ==
Five Polish citizens were murdered by Nazi Germany in the village during World War II.
