= Ćwiętalka =

- Village
- Location within Poland
- Coordinates: 51°3′22″N 21°55′44″E
- Country: Poland
- Voivodeship: Lublin
- County: Opole
- Gmina: Opole Lubelskie

Ćwiętalka [t͡ɕfjɛnˈtalka] is a village in the administrative district of Gmina Opole Lubelskie, within Opole County, Lublin Voivodeship, in eastern Poland.
