= Niezabitów =

- Village
- Location within Poland
- Coordinates: 51°15′N 22°8′E
- Country: Poland
- Voivodeship: Lublin
- County: Opole
- Gmina: Poniatowa

Niezabitów [ɲɛzaˈbituf] is a village in the administrative district of Gmina Poniatowa, within Opole County, Lublin Voivodeship, in eastern Poland.
