= Niezabitów-Kolonia =

- Village
- Location within Poland
- Coordinates: 51°14′43″N 22°06′30″E
- Country: Poland
- Voivodeship: Lublin
- County: Opole
- Gmina: Poniatowa

Niezabitów-Kolonia [ɲɛzaˈbituf kɔˈlɔɲa] is a village in the administrative district of Gmina Poniatowa, within Opole County, Lublin Voivodeship, in eastern Poland.
