= Truszków =

- Village
- Location within Poland
- Coordinates: 51°06′16″N 22°04′04″E
- Country: Poland
- Voivodeship: Lublin
- County: Opole
- Gmina: Opole Lubelskie

Truszków [ˈtruʂkuf] is a village in the administrative district of Gmina Opole Lubelskie, within Opole County, Lublin Voivodeship, in eastern Poland.
