= Adelina, Gmina Chodel =

Adelina
- Village
- Location within Poland
- Coordinates: 51°9′N 22°9′E
- Country: Poland
- Voivodeship: Lublin
- County: Opole
- Gmina: Chodel

Adelina [adɛˈlina] is a village in the administrative district of Gmina Chodel, within Opole County, Lublin Voivodeship, in eastern Poland.
