= Wrzelowiec-Kierzki =

- Village
- Location within Poland
- Coordinates: 51°06′06″N 21°53′52″E
- Country: Poland
- Voivodeship: Lublin
- County: Opole
- Gmina: Opole Lubelskie
- Population: 60

Wrzelowiec-Kierzki [vʐɛˈlɔvjɛt͡s ˈkʲɛʂki] is a village in the administrative district of Gmina Opole Lubelskie, within Opole County, Lublin Voivodeship, in eastern Poland.
