= Zaborze, Lublin Voivodeship =

Zaborze
- Village
- Location within Poland
- Coordinates: 51°16′40″N 22°3′58″E
- Country: Poland
- Voivodeship: Lublin
- County: Opole
- Gmina: Karczmiska

Zaborze [zaˈbɔʐɛ] is a village in the administrative district of Gmina Karczmiska, within Opole County, Lublin Voivodeship, in eastern Poland.
