= Kępa Gostecka =

- Village
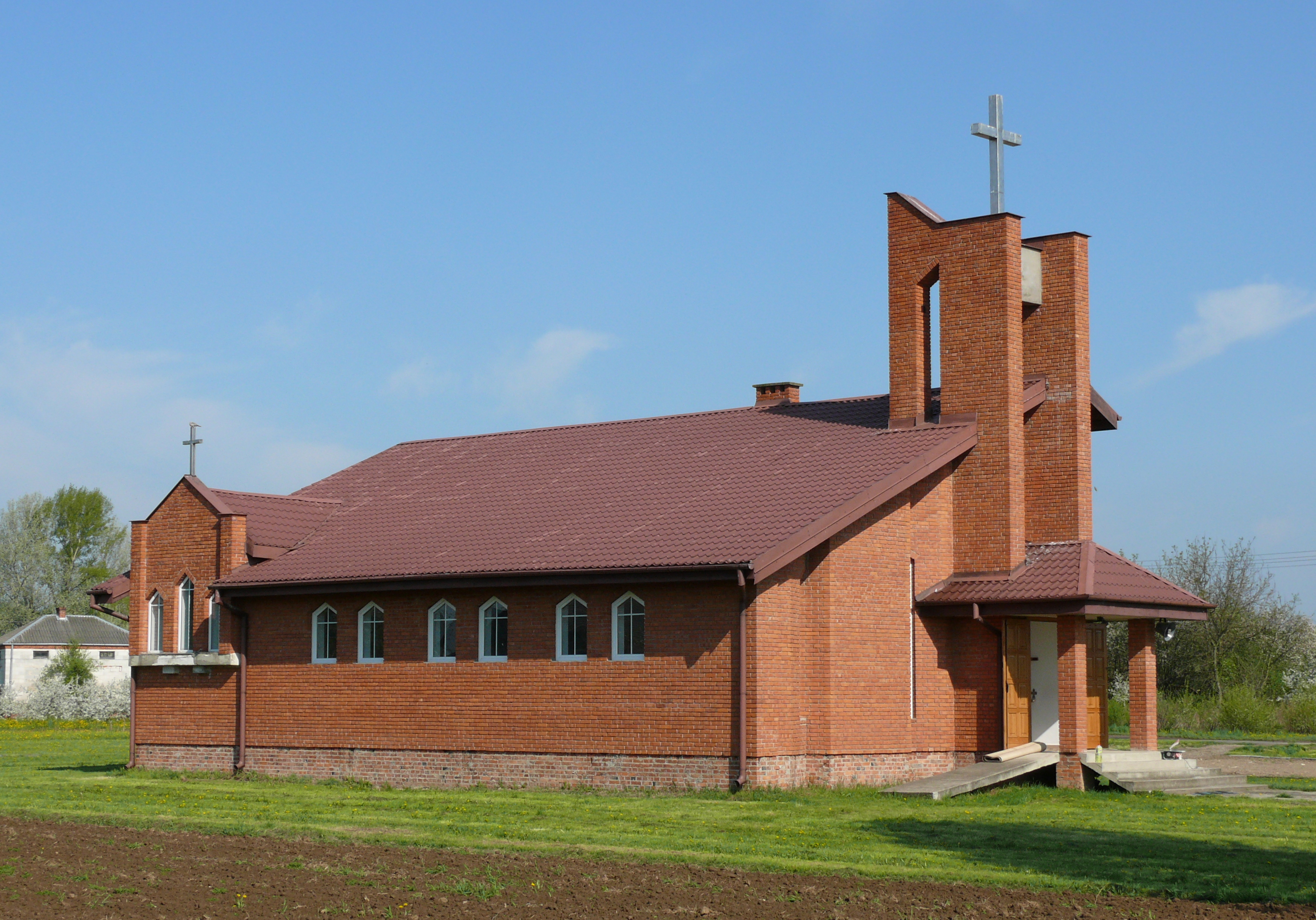
- Chapel

- Location within Poland
- Coordinates: 51°9′N 21°47′E
- Country: Poland
- Voivodeship: Lublin
- County: Opole
- Gmina: Łaziska
- Population: 336

Kępa Gostecka [ˈkɛmpa ɡɔsˈtɛt͡ska] is a village in the administrative district of Gmina Łaziska, within Opole County, Lublin Voivodeship, in eastern Poland. Until 2005 it was part of Gmina Solec nad Wisłą in Masovian Voivodeship.

== History ==
The village was founded in 1789 by the Świętokrzyskie Benedictines on the land taken by the Vistula village of Goszcza in the place where after the flood of the Vistula the village land remained the only farm field on the Vistula clump (Chałupa Goszcza)
