= Szczekarków, Gmina Wilków =

Szczekarków
- Village
- Location within Poland
- Coordinates: 51°15′N 21°53′E
- Country: Poland
- Voivodeship: Lublin
- County: Opole
- Gmina: Wilków

Szczekarków [ʂt͡ʂɛˈkarkuf] is a village in the administrative district of Gmina Wilków, within Opole County, Lublin Voivodeship, in eastern Poland.
