= Grabowiec, Gmina Łaziska =

Grabowiec
- Village
- Location within Poland
- Coordinates: 51°12′38″N 21°49′46″E
- Country: Poland
- Voivodeship: Lublin
- County: Opole
- Gmina: Łaziska

Grabowiec [ɡraˈbɔvjɛt͡s] is a village in the administrative district of Gmina Łaziska, within Opole County, Lublin Voivodeship, in eastern Poland.
