= Kępa Piotrawińska =

- Village
- Location within Poland
- Coordinates: 51°06′36″N 21°52′11″E
- Country: Poland
- Voivodeship: Lublin
- County: Opole
- Gmina: Łaziska

Kępa Piotrawińska [ˈkɛmpa pjɔtraˈviɲska] is a village in the administrative district of Gmina Łaziska, within Opole County, Lublin Voivodeship, in eastern Poland.
