= Kręciszówka =

- Village
- Location within Poland
- Coordinates: 51°05′08″N 21°58′27″E
- Country: Poland
- Voivodeship: Lublin
- County: Opole
- Gmina: Opole Lubelskie
- Population: 136

Kręciszówka [krɛnt͡ɕiˈʂufka] is a village in the administrative district of Gmina Opole Lubelskie, within Opole County, Lublin Voivodeship, in eastern Poland.
