= Łaziska-Kolonia =

- Village
- Location within Poland
- Coordinates: 51°7′21″N 21°53′12″E
- Country: Poland
- Voivodeship: Lublin
- County: Opole
- Gmina: Łaziska
- Population: 200

Łaziska-Kolonia [waˈʑiska kɔˈlɔɲa] is a village in the administrative district of Gmina Łaziska, within Opole County, Lublin Voivodeship, in eastern Poland.
