= Stary Franciszków =

- Village
- Location within Poland
- Coordinates: 51°05′44″N 21°59′23″E
- Country: Poland
- Voivodeship: Lublin
- County: Opole
- Gmina: Opole Lubelskie

Stary Franciszków (Polish pronunciation: [ˈstarɨ fraɲˈt͡ɕiʂkuf]) is a village in the administrative district of Gmina Opole Lubelskie, within Opole County, Lublin Voivodeship, in eastern Poland.
