= Wrzelowiec =

- Village
- Location within Poland
- Coordinates: 51°5′N 21°56′E
- Country: Poland
- Voivodeship: Lublin
- County: Opole
- Gmina: Opole Lubelskie
- Population: 413

Wrzelowiec [vʐɛˈlɔvjɛt͡s] is a village in the administrative district of Gmina Opole Lubelskie, within Opole County, Lublin Voivodeship, in eastern Poland.

The village gives its name to the protected area called Wrzelowiec Landscape Park.
