= Dębiny, Gmina Opole Lubelskie =

Dębiny
- Village
- Location within Poland
- Coordinates: 51°9′0″N 22°4′9″E
- Country: Poland
- Voivodeship: Lublin
- County: Opole
- Gmina: Opole Lubelskie
- Population: 170

Dębiny [dɛmˈbinɨ] is a village in the administrative district of Gmina Opole Lubelskie, within Opole County, Lublin Voivodeship, in eastern Poland.

In 2005 the village had a population of 170.
