= Lipiny, Gmina Chodel =

Lipiny
- Village
- Location within Poland
- Coordinates: 51°8′27″N 22°7′35″E
- Country: Poland
- Voivodeship: Lublin
- County: Opole
- Gmina: Chodel

Lipiny [liˈpinɨ] is a village in the administrative district of Gmina Chodel, within Opole County, Lublin Voivodeship, in eastern Poland.
