= Kłodnica (disambiguation) =

The Kłodnica is a river in Upper Silesia, southern Poland.

Kłodnica may also refer to:

- Kłodnica, Lublin Voivodeship, a village in east Poland
- Kłodnica, Lubusz Voivodeship, a village in west Poland
- Kłodnica, Kędzierzyn-Koźle, a district of the city of Kędzierzyn-Koźle, Poland
