= Wola Rudzka =

- Village
- Location within Poland
- Coordinates: 51°11′N 21°59′E
- Country: Poland
- Voivodeship: Lublin
- County: Opole
- Gmina: Opole Lubelskie

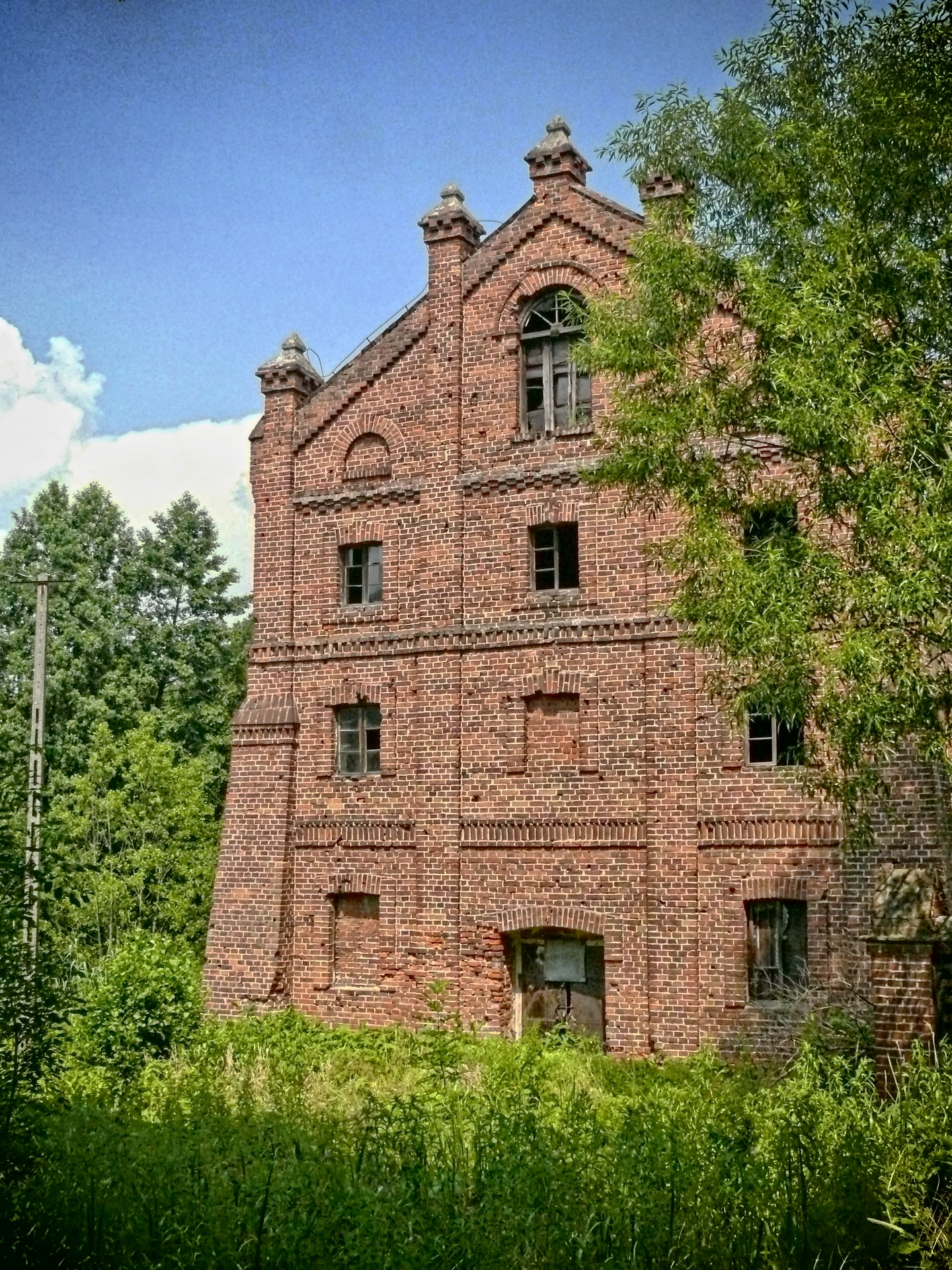
Old mill

Wola Rudzka [ˈvɔla ˈrut͡ska] is a village in the administrative district of Gmina Opole Lubelskie, within Opole County, Lublin Voivodeship, in eastern Poland.
