= Niedźwiada Mała =

- Village
- Location within Poland
- Coordinates: 51°10′29″N 21°51′14″E
- Country: Poland
- Voivodeship: Lublin
- County: Opole
- Gmina: Łaziska

Niedźwiada Mała [ɲɛd͡ʑˈvjada ˈmawa] is a village in the administrative district of Gmina Łaziska, within Opole County, Lublin Voivodeship, in eastern Poland.
