= Zastów Karczmiski =

- Village
- Location within Poland
- Coordinates: 51°16′10″N 21°52′03″E
- Country: Poland
- Voivodeship: Lublin
- County: Opole
- Gmina: Wilków

Zastów Karczmiski [ˈzastuf kart͡ʂˈmiski] is a village in the administrative district of Gmina Wilków, within Opole County, Lublin Voivodeship, in eastern Poland.
