= Jeżów, Lublin Voivodeship =

Jeżów
- Village
- Location within Poland
- Coordinates: 51°06′26″N 22°09′20″E
- Country: Poland
- Voivodeship: Lublin
- County: Opole
- Gmina: Chodel

Jeżów [ˈjɛʐuf] is a village in the administrative district of Gmina Chodel, within Opole County, Lublin Voivodeship, in eastern Poland.
