= Stanisława Prządka =

Polish politician (born 1943)

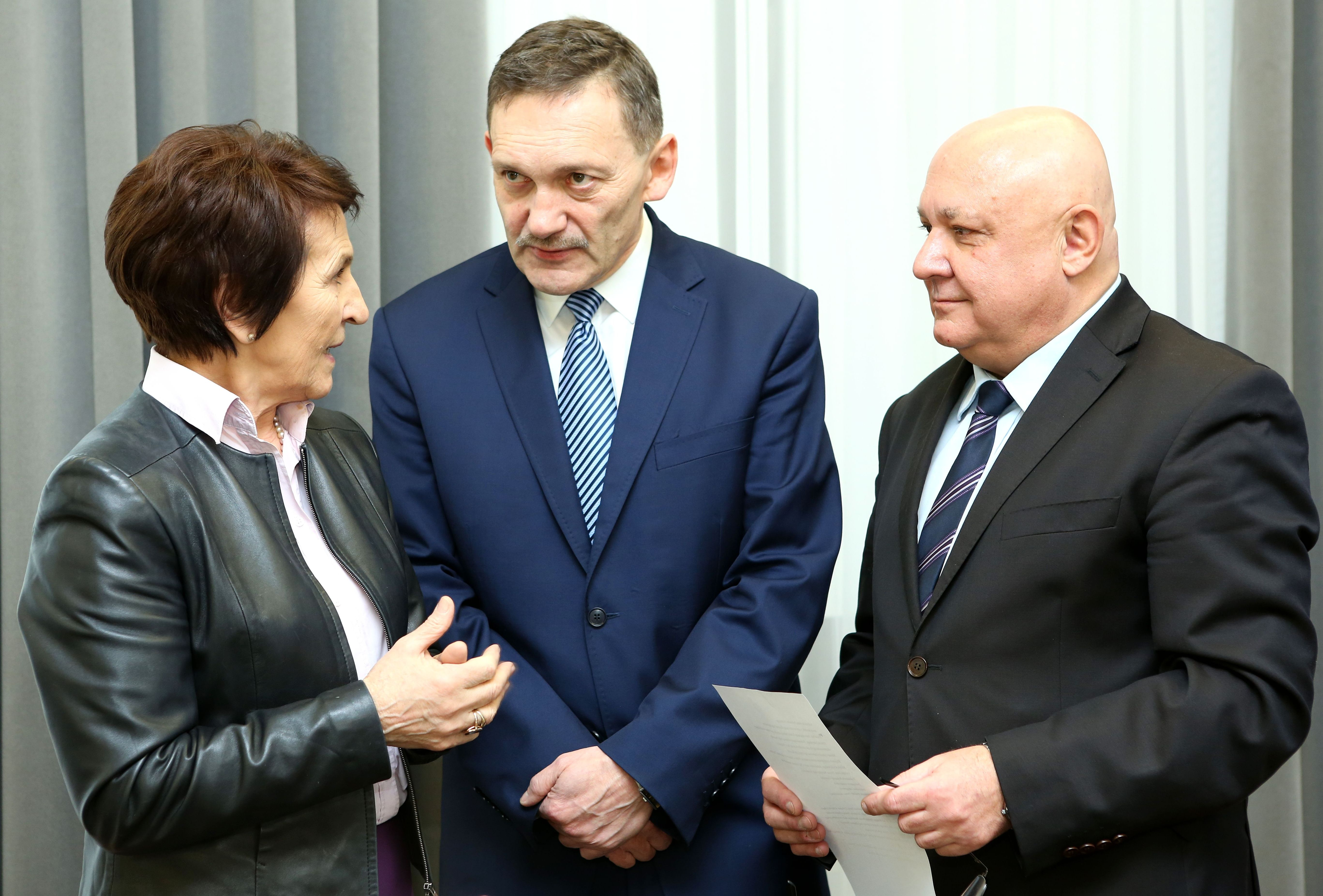
- Prządka, with Edward Zalewski and Piotr Zientarski

Member of the Sejm
- In office 19 October 2001 – 11 November 2015
- Constituency: 18 – Siedlce

Personal details
- Born: 6 May 1943 (age 82)
- Party: Democratic Left Alliance

Stanisława Alicja Prządka (born 6 May 1943 in Karczmiska) is a Polish politician. She was elected to Sejm on 25 September 2005, getting 7674 votes in 18 Siedlce district as a candidate from Democratic Left Alliance list.

She was also a member of Sejm 2001-2005.

== See also ==
- Members of Polish Sejm 2005-2007
