= Puszno Skokowskie =

- Village
- Location within Poland
- Coordinates: 51°6′N 22°3′E
- Country: Poland
- Voivodeship: Lublin
- County: Opole
- Gmina: Opole Lubelskie
- Time zone: UTC+1 (CET)
  - Summer (DST): UTC+2 (CEST)
- Vehicle registration: LOP

Puszno Skokowskie [ˈpuʂnɔ skɔˈkɔfskʲɛ] is a village in the administrative district of Gmina Opole Lubelskie, within Opole County, Lublin Voivodeship, in eastern Poland.

== History ==
Historical population
| Year | Pop. | ±% |
|---|---|---|
| 1827 | 116 | — |
| 1921 | 193 | +66.4% |

According to the 1921 Polish census, the population was exclusively Polish.

Following the German-Soviet invasion of Poland, which started World War II in September 1939, the village was occupied by Germany until 1944. On 15 December 1942, the German gendarmerie and Ukrainian Auxiliary Police committed a massacre of five Poles, three men and two women.
