= Szkuciska =

- Village
- Location within Poland
- Coordinates: 51°14′05″N 21°49′57″E
- Country: Poland
- Voivodeship: Lublin
- County: Opole
- Gmina: Wilków
- Population: 36

Szkuciska [ʂkuˈt͡ɕiska] is a village in the administrative district of Gmina Wilków, within Opole County, Lublin Voivodeship, in eastern Poland.
