= Szczekarków-Kolonia =

- Village
- Location within Poland
- Coordinates: 51°14′13″N 21°53′22″E
- Country: Poland
- Voivodeship: Lublin
- County: Opole
- Gmina: Wilków

Szczekarków-Kolonia [ʂt͡ʂɛˈkarkuf kɔˈlɔɲa] is a village in the administrative district of Gmina Wilków, within Opole County, Lublin Voivodeship, in eastern Poland.
