= Głusko Duże-Kolonia =

- Village
- Location within Poland
- Coordinates: 51°12′26″N 22°0′21″E
- Country: Poland
- Voivodeship: Lublin
- County: Opole
- Gmina: Karczmiska
- Population: 340

Głusko Duże-Kolonia [ˈɡwuskɔ ˈduʐɛ kɔˈlɔɲa] is a village in the administrative district of Gmina Karczmiska, within Opole County, Lublin Voivodeship, in eastern Poland.
