= Mieczysławka =

Mieczysławka may refer to the following places:

- Mieczysławka, Lubartów County in Lublin Voivodeship (east Poland)
- Mieczysławka, Gmina Karczmiska in Opole County, Lublin Voivodeship (east Poland)
