= Las Dębowy =

- Village
- Location within Poland
- Coordinates: 51°13′N 21°49′E
- Country: Poland
- Voivodeship: Lublin
- County: Opole
- Gmina: Łaziska
- Population (approx.): 300

Las Dębowy [ˈlas dɛmˈbɔvɨ] is a village in the administrative district of Gmina Łaziska, within Opole County, Lublin Voivodeship, in eastern Poland.
