= Piotrawin, Gmina Łaziska =

Piotrawin
- Village
- Location within Poland
- Coordinates: 51°06′10″N 21°48′00″E
- Country: Poland
- Voivodeship: Lublin
- County: Opole
- Gmina: Łaziska

Piotrawin [pjɔˈtravin] is a village in the administrative district of Gmina Łaziska, within Opole County, Lublin Voivodeship, in eastern Poland.
