= Darowne =

- Village
- Location within Poland
- Coordinates: 51°10′N 22°3′E
- Country: Poland
- Voivodeship: Lublin
- County: Opole
- Gmina: Opole Lubelskie
- Area: 2.07 km^{2} (0.80 sq mi)
- Population: 155

Darowne [daˈrɔvnɛ] is a village in the administrative district of Gmina Opole Lubelskie, within Opole County, Lublin Voivodeship, in eastern Poland.
