= Majdan Trzebieski =

- Village
- Location within Poland
- Coordinates: 51°10′21″N 22°01′33″E
- Country: Poland
- Voivodeship: Lublin
- County: Opole
- Gmina: Opole Lubelskie

Majdan Trzebieski (Polish pronunciation: [ˈmajdan tʂɛˈbjɛskʲi]) is a village in the administrative district of Gmina Opole Lubelskie, within Opole County, Lublin Voivodeship, in eastern Poland.
