= Kluczkowice-Osiedle =

- Village
- Location within Poland
- Coordinates: 51°4′N 21°55′E
- Country: Poland
- Voivodeship: Lublin
- County: Opole
- Gmina: Opole Lubelskie
- Population: 560

Kluczkowice-Osiedle [klut͡ʂkɔˈvit͡sɛ ɔˈɕɛdlɛ] is a village in the administrative district of Gmina Opole Lubelskie, within Opole County, Lublin Voivodeship, in eastern Poland.
