= Kąty, Gmina Wilków =

Kąty
- Village
- Location within Poland
- Coordinates: 51°14′57″N 21°50′53″E
- Country: Poland
- Voivodeship: Lublin
- County: Opole
- Gmina: Wilków

Kąty [ˈkɔntɨ] is a village in the administrative district of Gmina Wilków, within Opole County, Lublin Voivodeship, in eastern Poland.
