= Kowala Druga =

- Village
- Location within Poland
- Coordinates: 51°13′N 22°4′E
- Country: Poland
- Voivodeship: Lublin
- County: Opole
- Gmina: Poniatowa
- Population: 620

Kowala Druga [kɔˈvala ˈdruɡa] is a village in the administrative district of Gmina Poniatowa, within Opole County, Lublin Voivodeship, in eastern Poland.
