= Wolica-Kolonia =

- Village
- Location within Poland
- Coordinates: 51°12′28″N 22°1′38″E
- Country: Poland
- Voivodeship: Lublin
- County: Opole
- Gmina: Karczmiska
- Population: 240

Wolica-Kolonia [vɔˈlit͡sa kɔˈlɔɲa] is a village in the administrative district of Gmina Karczmiska, within Opole County, Lublin Voivodeship, in eastern Poland.
