= Trzciniec, Gmina Łaziska =

Trzciniec
- Village
- Location within Poland
- Coordinates: 51°11′48″N 21°52′42″E
- Country: Poland
- Voivodeship: Lublin
- County: Opole
- Gmina: Łaziska

Trzciniec [ˈtʂt͡ɕiɲɛt͡s] is a village in the administrative district of Gmina Łaziska, within Opole County, Lublin Voivodeship, in eastern Poland.
