= Białowoda =

- Village
- Location within Poland
- Coordinates: 51°4′N 22°3′E
- Country: Poland
- Voivodeship: Lublin
- County: Opole
- Gmina: Opole Lubelskie
- Population: 107

Białowoda [bjawɔˈvɔda] is a village in the administrative district of Gmina Opole Lubelskie, within Opole County, Lublin Voivodeship, in eastern Poland.
