= Janiszów =

Janiszów may refer to the following places in Poland:

- Janiszów, Kamienna Góra County in Lower Silesian Voivodeship (south-west Poland)
- Janiszów, Trzebnica County in Lower Silesian Voivodeship (south-west Poland)
- Janiszów, Kraśnik County in Lublin Voivodeship (east Poland)
- Janiszów, Gmina Łaziska in Opole County, Lublin Voivodeship (east Poland)
