= Jankowa, Lublin Voivodeship =

Jankowa
- Village
- Location within Poland
- Coordinates: 51°10′15″N 21°56′29″E
- Country: Poland
- Voivodeship: Lublin
- County: Opole
- Gmina: Opole Lubelskie

Jankowa [janˈkɔva] is a village in the administrative district of Gmina Opole Lubelskie, within Opole County, Lublin Voivodeship, in eastern Poland.
