= Wojciechów, Gmina Łaziska =

Wojciechów
- Village
- Location within Poland
- Coordinates: 51°7′29″N 21°51′35″E
- Country: Poland
- Voivodeship: Lublin
- County: Opole
- Gmina: Łaziska

Wojciechów (Polish pronunciation: [vɔjˈt͡ɕɛxuf]) is a village in the administrative district of Gmina Łaziska, within Opole County, Lublin Voivodeship, in eastern Poland.
