= Kawęczyn, Gmina Chodel =

Kawęczyn
- Village
- Location within Poland
- Coordinates: 51°05′53.47″N 22°08′56.54″E
- Country: Poland
- Voivodeship: Lublin
- County: Opole
- Gmina: Chodel
- Time zone: UTC+1 (CET)
  - Summer (DST): UTC+2 (CEST)

Kawęczyn [kaˈvɛnt͡ʂɨn] is a village in the administrative district of Gmina Chodel, within Opole County, Lublin Voivodeship, in eastern Poland.

== History ==
Twelve Polish citizens were murdered by Nazi Germany in the village during World War II.
