= Kazimierzów, Lublin Voivodeship =

Kazimierzów
- Village
- Location within Poland
- Coordinates: 51°11′06″N 21°58′58″E
- Country: Poland
- Voivodeship: Lublin
- County: Opole
- Gmina: Opole Lubelskie

Kazimierzów [kaʑiˈmjɛʐuf] is a village in the administrative district of Gmina Opole Lubelskie, within Opole County, Lublin Voivodeship, in eastern Poland.
