= Kolonia Wrzelów =

- Village
- Location within Poland
- Coordinates: 51°12′58″N 21°51′40″E
- Country: Poland
- Voivodeship: Lublin
- County: Opole
- Gmina: Wilków

Kolonia Wrzelów [kɔˈlɔɲa ˈvʐɛluf] is a village in the administrative district of Gmina Wilków, within Opole County, Lublin Voivodeship, in eastern Poland.
