= Poniatowa-Wieś =

- Village
- Location within Poland
- Coordinates: 51°10′48″N 22°7′47″E
- Country: Poland
- Voivodeship: Lublin
- County: Opole
- Gmina: Poniatowa
- Population: 550

Poniatowa-Wieś [pɔɲaˈtɔva ˈvjɛɕ] is a village in the administrative district of Gmina Poniatowa, within Opole County, Lublin Voivodeship, in eastern Poland.
