= Brzozowa, Lublin Voivodeship =

Brzozowa
- Village
- Location within Poland
- Coordinates: 51°14′22″N 21°50′49″E
- Country: Poland
- Voivodeship: Lublin
- County: Opole
- Gmina: Wilków

Brzozowa [bʐɔˈzɔva] is a village in the administrative district of Gmina Wilków, within Opole County, Lublin Voivodeship, in eastern Poland.
