= Jaworce =

- Village
- Location within Poland
- Coordinates: 51°15′52″N 21°59′12″E
- Country: Poland
- Voivodeship: Lublin
- County: Opole
- Gmina: Karczmiska
- Population: 20

Jaworce [jaˈvɔrt͡sɛ] is a village in the administrative district of Gmina Karczmiska, within Opole County, Lublin Voivodeship, in eastern Poland.
