= Góry Kluczkowickie =

- Village
- Location within Poland
- Coordinates: 51°4′19″N 21°55′34″E
- Country: Poland
- Voivodeship: Lublin
- County: Opole
- Gmina: Opole Lubelskie

Góry Kluczkowickie [ˈɡurɨ klut͡ʂkɔˈvit͡skʲɛ] is a village in the administrative district of Gmina Opole Lubelskie, within Opole County, Lublin Voivodeship, in eastern Poland.
