= Wymysłów, Gmina Karczmiska =

Wymysłów
- Village
- Location within Poland
- Coordinates: 51°15′N 22°3′E
- Country: Poland
- Voivodeship: Lublin
- County: Opole
- Gmina: Karczmiska

Wymysłów [vɨˈmɨswuf] is a village in the administrative district of Gmina Karczmiska, within Opole County, Lublin Voivodeship, in eastern Poland.
