= Elżbieta-Kolonia =

- Village
- Location within Poland
- Coordinates: 51°07′18″N 21°55′41″E
- Country: Poland
- Voivodeship: Lublin
- County: Opole
- Gmina: Opole Lubelskie
- Population: 124

Elżbieta-Kolonia [ɛlʐˈbjɛta kɔˈlɔɲa] is a village in the administrative district of Gmina Opole Lubelskie, within Opole County, Lublin Voivodeship, in eastern Poland.
