= Ratoszyn Pierwszy =

- Village
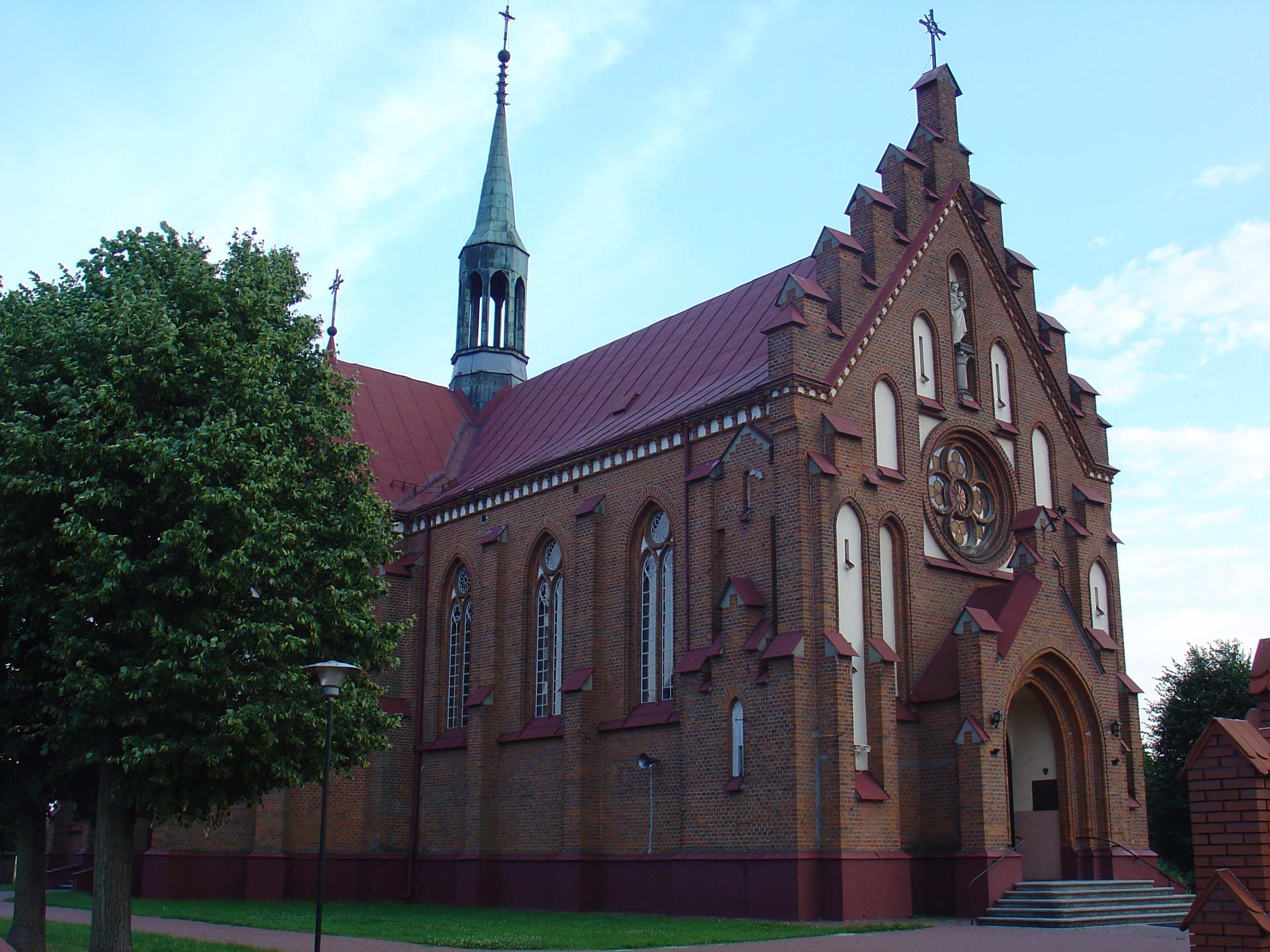
- Saints Matthias and Catherine church

- Location within Poland
- Coordinates: 51°4′52″N 22°9′36″E
- Country: Poland
- Voivodeship: Lublin
- County: Opole
- Gmina: Chodel

Population
  - Total: 460
- Time zone: UTC+1 (CET)
  - Summer (DST): UTC+2 (CEST)

Ratoszyn Pierwszy [raˈtɔʂɨn ˈpjɛrfʂɨ] is a village in the administrative district of Gmina Chodel, within Opole County, Lublin Voivodeship, in eastern Poland.

== History ==
Nine Polish citizens were murdered by Nazi Germany in the village during World War II.
