= Kłodnica, Lublin Voivodeship =

Kłodnica
- Village
- Location within Poland
- Coordinates: 51°15′N 21°53′E
- Country: Poland
- Voivodeship: Lublin
- County: Opole
- Gmina: Wilków

Kłodnica [kwɔdˈnit͡sa] is a village in the administrative district of Gmina Wilków, within Opole County, Lublin Voivodeship, in eastern Poland.
