= Borów-Kolonia, Gmina Chodel =

Borów-Kolonia
- Village
- Location within Poland
- Coordinates: 51°6′40″N 22°12′23″E
- Country: Poland
- Voivodeship: Lublin
- County: Opole
- Gmina: Chodel

Borów-Kolonia [ˈbɔruf kɔˈlɔɲa] is a village in the administrative district of Gmina Chodel, within Opole County, Lublin Voivodeship, in eastern Poland.
