= Elżbieta, Lublin Voivodeship =

Elżbieta
- Village
- Location within Poland
- Coordinates: 51°8′N 21°57′E
- Country: Poland
- Voivodeship: Lublin
- County: Opole
- Gmina: Opole Lubelskie

Elżbieta [ɛlʐˈbjɛta] is a village in the administrative district of Gmina Opole Lubelskie, within Opole County, Lublin Voivodeship, in eastern Poland.
