= Łaziska, Gmina Łaziska =

Łaziska
- Village
- Location within Poland
- Coordinates: 51°8′30″N 21°52′42″E
- Country: Poland
- Voivodeship: Lublin
- County: Opole
- Gmina: Łaziska
- Population: 560

Łaziska [waˈʑiska] is a village in Opole County, Lublin Voivodeship, in eastern Poland. It is the seat of the gmina (administrative district) called Gmina Łaziska.
