= Gmina Wilków, Lublin Voivodeship =

Gmina Wilków Wilków Commune
- Gmina
- Coat of arms
- Interactive map of Gmina Wilków
- Coordinates (Wilków): 51°15′37″N 21°52′24″E
- Country: Poland
- Voivodeship: Lublin
- County: Opole
- Seat: Wilków

Area
  - Total: 79.54 km^{2} (30.71 sq mi)

Population (2015)
  - Total: 4,561
  - Density: 57.34/km^{2} (148.5/sq mi)

Gmina Wilków is a rural gmina (administrative district) in Opole County, Lublin Voivodeship, in eastern Poland. Its seat is the village of Wilków, which lies approximately 14 kilometres (9 mi) north-west of Opole Lubelskie and 49 km (30 mi) west of the regional capital Lublin.

The gmina covers an area of 79.54 square kilometres (30.7 sq mi), and as of 2006 its total population is 4,863 (4,561 in 2015).

== Flood ==
In May and June 2010, in 2010 Central European floods, Wilków gmina were flooded in 90% of the all area, leaving only Rogów unflooded.

== Villages ==
Gmina Wilków contains the villages and settlements of Brzozowa, Dobre, Kąty, Kępa Chotecka, Kłodnica, Kolonia Wrzelów, Kosiorów, Lubomirka, Machów, Majdany, Podgórz, Polanówka, Rogów, Rybaki, Szczekarków, Szczekarków-Kolonia, Szkuciska, Urządków, Wilków, Wilków-Kolonia, Wólka Polanowska, Zagłoba, Zarudki, Zastów Karczmiski, Zastów Polanowski and Żmijowiska.

== Neighbouring gminas ==
Gmina Wilków is bordered by the gminas of Chotcza, Janowiec, Karczmiska, Kazimierz Dolny, Łaziska and Przyłęk.
