= Janiszów, Gmina Łaziska =

Janiszów
- Village
- Location within Poland
- Coordinates: 51°08′17″N 21°51′21″E
- Country: Poland
- Voivodeship: Lublin
- County: Opole
- Gmina: Łaziska
- Time zone: UTC+1 (CET)
  - Summer (DST): UTC+2 (CEST)

Janiszów [jaˈniʂuf] is a village in the administrative district of Gmina Łaziska, within Opole County, Lublin Voivodeship, in eastern Poland.

== History ==
Five Polish citizens were murdered by Nazi Germany in the village during World War II.
