= Machów, Lublin Voivodeship =

Machów
- Village
- Location within Poland
- Coordinates: 51°14′53″N 21°49′27″E
- Country: Poland
- Voivodeship: Lublin
- County: Opole
- Gmina: Wilków

Machów [ˈmaxuf] is a village in the administrative district of Gmina Wilków, within Opole County, Lublin Voivodeship, in eastern Poland.
