= Ratoszyn Drugi =

- Village
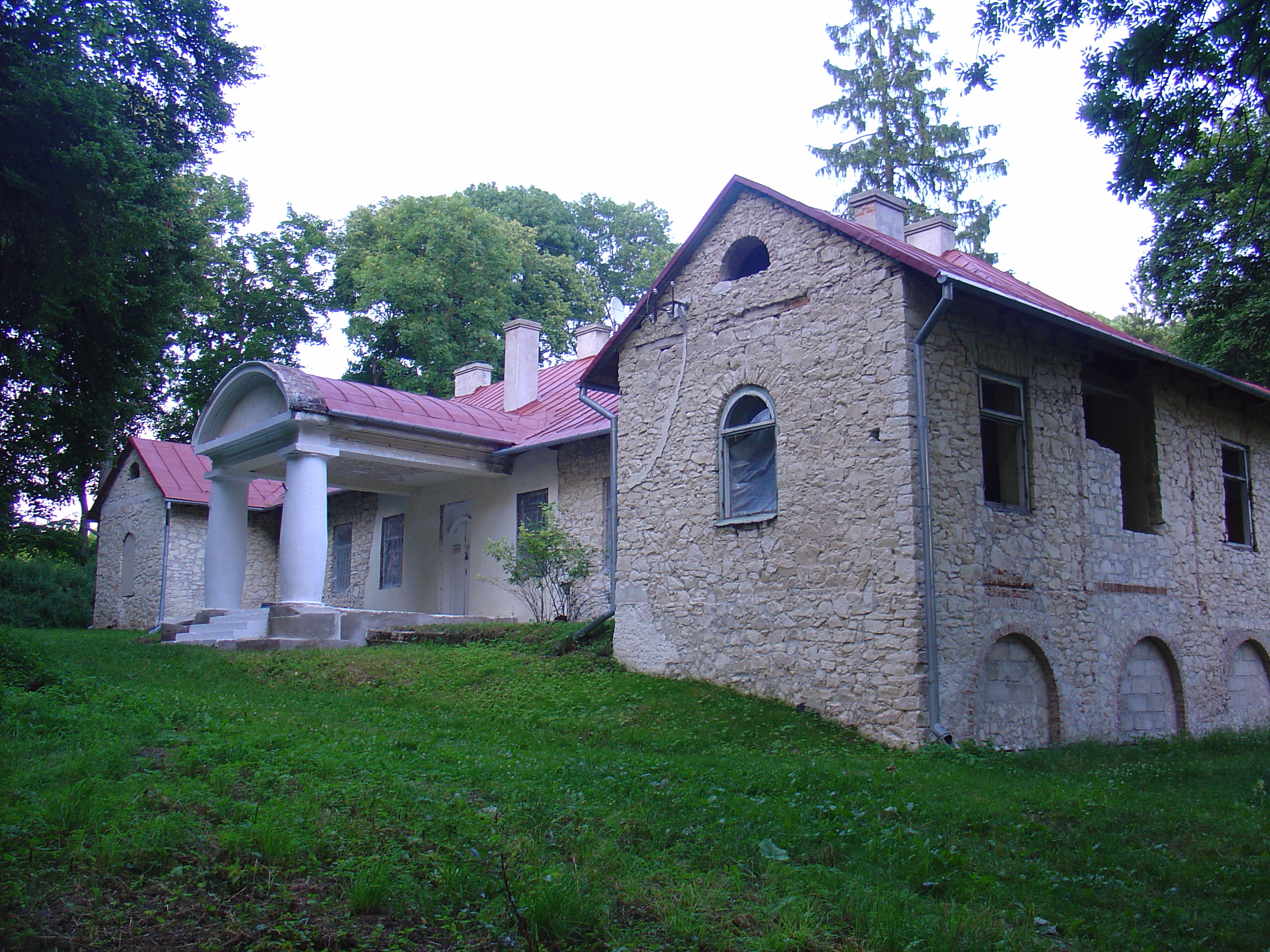

- Location within Poland
- Coordinates: 51°04′21″N 22°10′12″E
- Country: Poland
- Voivodeship: Lublin
- County: Opole
- Gmina: Chodel

Ratoszyn Drugi [raˈtɔʂɨn ˈdruɡi] is a village in the administrative district of Gmina Chodel, within Opole County, Lublin Voivodeship, in eastern Poland.
