= Gmina Łaziska =

Gmina Łaziska Łaziska Commune
- Gmina
- Flag Coat of arms
- Interactive map of Gmina Łaziska
- Coordinates (Łaziska): 51°8′30″N 21°52′42″E
- Country: Poland
- Voivodeship: Lublin
- County: Opole
- Seat: Łaziska

Area
  - Total: 109.32 km^{2} (42.21 sq mi)

Population (2015)
  - Total: 4,996
  - Density: 45.70/km^{2} (118.4/sq mi)
- Website: http://www.gminalaziska.pl/

Gmina Łaziska is a rural gmina (administrative district) in Opole County, Lublin Voivodeship, in eastern Poland. Its seat is the village of Łaziska, which lies approximately 7 kilometres (4 mi) west of Opole Lubelskie and 50 km (31 mi) west of the regional capital Lublin.

The gmina covers an area of 109.32 square kilometres (42.2 sq mi), and as of 2006 its total population is 5,262 (4,996 in 2015).

== Villages ==
Gmina Łaziska contains the villages and settlements of Braciejowice, Głodno, Grabowiec, Janiszów, Kamień, Kępa Gostecka, Kępa Piotrawińska, Kępa Solecka, Koło, Kolonia-Kamień, Kopanina Kaliszańska, Kopanina Kamieńska, Kosiorów, Las Dębowy, Łaziska, Łaziska-Kolonia, Niedźwiada Duża, Niedźwiada Mała, Piotrawin, Piotrawin-Kolonia, Trzciniec, Wojciechów, Wrzelów, Zakrzów and Zgoda.

== Neighbouring gminas ==
Gmina Łaziska is bordered by the gminas of Chotcza, Józefów nad Wisłą, Karczmiska, Opole Lubelskie, Solec nad Wisłą and Wilków.
