= Gmina Opole Lubelskie =

Gmina Opole Lubelskie Opole Lubelskie Commune
- Gmina
- Coat of arms
- Interactive map of Gmina Opole Lubelskie
- Coordinates (Opole Lubelskie): 51°9′N 21°58′E
- Country: Poland
- Voivodeship: Lublin
- County: Opole
- Seat: Opole Lubelskie

Area
  - Total: 193.81 km^{2} (74.83 sq mi)

Population (2015)
  - Total: 17,633
  - Density: 90.981/km^{2} (235.64/sq mi)
  - Urban: 8,734
  - Rural: 8,899
- Website: http://www.inter.media.pl/nt-bin/opolelubelskie/

Gmina Opole Lubelskie is an urban-rural gmina (administrative district) in Opole County, Lublin Voivodeship, in eastern Poland. Its seat is the town of Opole Lubelskie, which is approximately 44 kilometres (27 mi) west of the regional capital Lublin.

The gmina covers an area of 193.81 square kilometres (74.8 sq mi) and, in 2006, its total population was 17,795 (of which the population of Opole Lubelskie amounted to 8,832 and the population of the rural part of the gmina was 8,963).

== Villages ==
Apart from the town of Opole Lubelskie, Gmina Opole Lubelskie contains the villages and settlements of Białowoda, Ćwiętalka, Dąbrowa Godowska, Darowne, Dębiny, Elżbieta, Elżbieta-Kolonia, Emilcin, Górna Owczarnia, Góry Kluczkowickie, Góry Opolskie, Grabówka, Jankowa, Kamionka, Kazimierzów, Kleniewo, Kluczkowice, Kluczkowice-Osiedle, Kręciszówka, Leonin, Ludwików, Majdan Trzebieski, Niezdów, Ożarów Drugi, Ożarów Pierwszy, Puszno Godowskie, Puszno Skokowskie, Rozalin, Ruda Godowska, Ruda Maciejowska, Sewerynówka, Skoków, Stanisławów, Stare Komaszyce, Stary Franciszków, Świdry, Truszków, Trzebiesza, Wandalin, Wola Rudzka, Wólka Komaszycka, Wrzelowiec, Wrzelowiec-Kierzki, Zadole, Zajączków and Zosin.

== Neighbouring gminas ==
Opole Lubelskie is bordered by Chodel, Józefów nad Wisłą, Karczmiska, Łaziska, Poniatowa and Urzędów.
