= Kopanina Kamieńska =

- Village
- Location within Poland
- Coordinates: 51°22′N 21°50′E
- Country: Poland
- Voivodeship: Lublin
- County: Opole
- Gmina: Łaziska
- Population: 250

Kopanina Kamieńska [kɔpaˈnina kaˈmjɛɲska] is a village in the administrative district of Gmina Łaziska, within Opole County, Lublin Voivodeship, in eastern Poland.
