= Wrzelowiec Landscape Park =

Protected area in Poland

Coordinates: 51.1777°N 21.9210°E

- Wrzelowiecki Park Krajobrazowy
- IUCN category V (protected landscape/seascape)
- Interactive map of Wrzelowiec Landscape Park
- Location: Lublin Voivodeship
- Area: 49.8 km^{2} (19.2 sq mi)
- Established: 1990

Wrzelowiec Landscape Park (Wrzelowiecki Park Krajobrazowy) is a protected area (Landscape Park) in eastern Poland, established in 1990, covering an area of 49.8 square kilometres (19.2 sq mi).

The Park lies within Lublin Voivodeship and takes its name from the village of Wrzelowiec.
