= Radlin, Lublin Voivodeship =

Radlin
- Village
- Location within Poland
- Coordinates: 51°3′46″N 22°11′52″E
- Country: Poland
- Voivodeship: Lublin
- County: Opole
- Gmina: Chodel
- Postal code: 24-350

Radlin [ˈradlʲin] is a village in the administrative district of Gmina Chodel, within Opole County, Lublin Voivodeship, in eastern Poland.
