= Gmina Chodel =

Gmina Chodel Chodel Commune
- Gmina
- Coat of arms
- Interactive map of Gmina Chodel
- Coordinates (Chodel): 51°6′43″N 22°7′59″E
- Country: Poland
- Voivodeship: Lublin
- County: Opole
- Seat: Chodel

Area
  - Total: 108.21 km^{2} (41.78 sq mi)

Population (2015)
  - Total: 6,717
  - Density: 62.07/km^{2} (160.8/sq mi)
- Website: http://www.chodel.gmina.pl/

Gmina Chodel is a rural gmina (administrative district) in Opole County, Lublin Voivodeship, in eastern Poland. Its seat is the village of Chodel, which lies approximately 13 kilometres (8 mi) east of Opole Lubelskie and 35 km (22 mi) south-west of the regional capital Lublin.

The gmina covers an area of 108.21 square kilometres (41.8 sq mi), and as of 2006 its total population is 6,771 (6,717 in 2015).

== Villages ==
Gmina Chodel contains the villages and settlements of Adelina, Antonówka, Borów, Borów-Kolonia, Budzyń, Chodel, Godów, Grądy, Granice, Huta Borowska, Jeżów, Kawęczyn, Książ, Lipiny, Majdan Borowski, Osiny, Przytyki, Radlin, Ratoszyn Drugi, Ratoszyn Pierwszy, Siewalka, Stasin, Świdno, Trzciniec, Zastawki and Zosinek.

== Neighbouring gminas ==
Gmina Chodel is bordered by the gminas of Bełżyce, Borzechów, Opole Lubelskie, Poniatowa and Urzędów.
