= Mieczysławka, Gmina Karczmiska =

Mieczysławka
- Village
- Location within Poland
- Coordinates: 51°16′29″N 21°58′53″E
- Country: Poland
- Voivodeship: Lublin
- County: Opole
- Gmina: Karczmiska

Mieczysławka ([mjɛt͡ʂɨˈswafka]) is a village in the administrative district of Gmina Karczmiska, within Opole County, Lublin Voivodeship, in eastern Poland.
