= Wilków, Gmina Wilków =

Wilków
- Village
- Location within Poland
- Coordinates: 51°15′37″N 21°52′24″E
- Country: Poland
- Voivodeship: Lublin
- County: Opole
- Gmina: Wilków
- Population: 208

Wilków [ˈvilkuf] is a village in Opole County, Lublin Voivodeship, in eastern Poland. It is the seat of the gmina (administrative district) called Gmina Wilków.
