= Gmina Karczmiska =

Gmina Karczmiska Karczmiska Commune
- Gmina
- Flag Coat of arms
- Interactive map of Gmina Karczmiska
- Coordinates (Karczmiska): 51°13′48″N 21°59′20″E
- Country: Poland
- Voivodeship: Lublin
- County: Opole
- Seat: Karczmiska

Area
  - Total: 95.21 km^{2} (36.76 sq mi)

Population (2015)
  - Total: 5,684
  - Density: 59.70/km^{2} (154.6/sq mi)
- Website: http://www.karczmiska.lubelskie.pl

Gmina Karczmiska is a rural gmina (administrative district) in Opole County, Lublin Voivodeship, in eastern Poland. Its seat is the village of Karczmiska, which lies approximately 10 kilometres (6 mi) north of Opole Lubelskie and 41 km (25 mi) west of the regional capital Lublin.

The gmina covers an area of 95.21 square kilometres (36.8 sq mi), and as of 2006 its total population is 6,192 (5,684 in 2015).

== Villages ==
Gmina Karczmiska contains the villages and settlements of Bielsko, Chodlik, Głusko Duże-Kolonia, Głusko Małe, Górki, Jaworce, Karczmiska, Mieczysławka, Noworąblów, Słotwiny, Uściąż, Uściąż-Kolonia, Wolica, Wolica-Kolonia, Wymysłów, Zaborze and Zagajdzie.

== Neighbouring gminas ==
Gmina Karczmiska is bordered by the gminas of Kazimierz Dolny, Łaziska, Opole Lubelskie, Poniatowa, Wąwolnica and Wilków.
