= Gmina Poniatowa =

Gmina Poniatowa Poniatowa Commune
- Gmina
- Coat of arms
- Interactive map of Gmina Poniatowa
- Coordinates (Poniatowa): 51°11′N 22°4′E
- Country: Poland
- Voivodeship: Lublin
- County: Opole
- Seat: Poniatowa

Area
  - Total: 84.16 km^{2} (32.49 sq mi)

Population (2015)
  - Total: 14,630
  - Density: 173.8/km^{2} (450.2/sq mi)
  - Urban: 9,495
  - Rural: 5,135
- Website: https://web.archive.org/web/20070315201301/http://www.umponiatowa.pl/

Gmina Poniatowa is an urban-rural gmina (administrative district) in Opole County, Lublin Voivodeship, in eastern Poland. Its seat is the town of Poniatowa, which lies approximately 8 kilometres (5 mi) north-east of Opole Lubelskie and 36 km (22 mi) west of the regional capital Lublin.

The gmina covers an area of 84.16 square kilometres (32.5 sq mi), and as of 2006 its total population is 15,146 (out of which the population of Poniatowa amounts to 9,911, and the population of the rural part of the gmina is 5,235).

== Villages ==
Apart from the town of Poniatowa, Gmina Poniatowa contains the villages and settlements of Dąbrowa Wronowska, Henin, Kocianów, Kowala Druga, Kowala Pierwsza, Kraczewice Prywatne, Kraczewice Rządowe, Niezabitów, Niezabitów-Kolonia, Obliźniak, Plizin, Poniatowa-Kolonia, Poniatowa-Wieś, Spławy, Szczuczki-Kolonia, Wólka Łubkowska and Zofianka.

== Neighbouring gminas ==
Gmina Poniatowa is bordered by the gminas of Bełżyce, Chodel, Karczmiska, Opole Lubelskie, Wąwolnica and Wojciechów.
