= Karczmiska, Gmina Karczmiska =

Karczmiska
- Village
- Location within Poland
- Coordinates: 51°13′48″N 21°59′20″E
- Country: Poland
- Voivodeship: Lublin
- County: Opole
- Gmina: Karczmiska
- Population: 800

Karczmiska [kart͡ʂˈmiska] is a village in Opole County, Lublin Voivodeship, in eastern Poland. It is the seat of the gmina (administrative district) called Gmina Karczmiska.
