= Chodel =

- Village
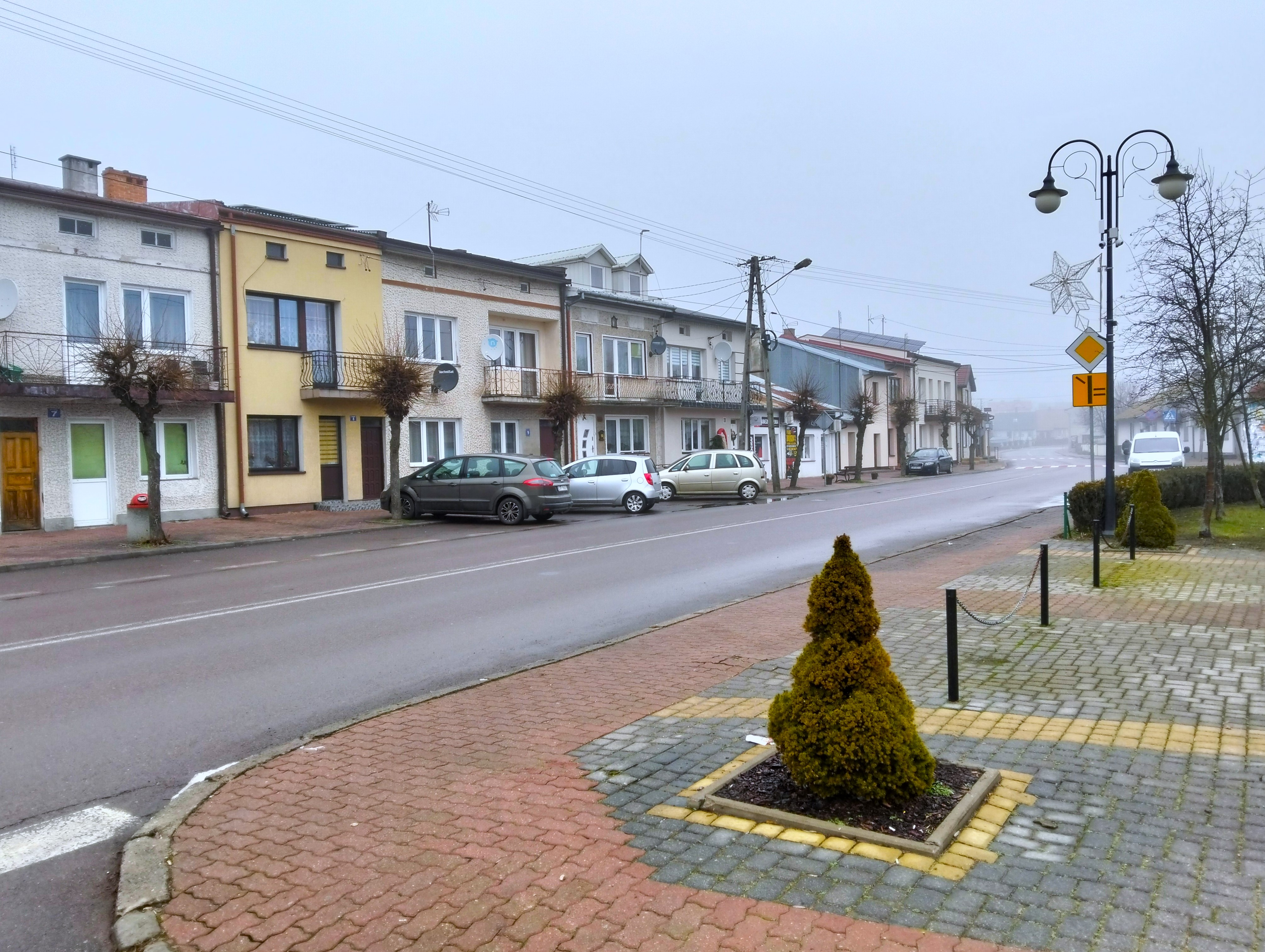
- Market Square in Chodel

- Location within Poland
- Coordinates: 51°6′43″N 22°7′59″E
- Country: Poland
- Voivodeship: Lublin
- County: Opole
- Gmina: Chodel
- Founded: 1440
- Elevation: 163 m (535 ft)

Population
  - Total: 1,400
- Time zone: UTC+1 (CET)
  - Summer (DST): UTC+2 (CEST)

Chodel [ˈxɔdɛl] is a village in Opole County, Lublin Voivodeship, in eastern Poland. It is the seat of the gmina (administrative district) called Gmina Chodel.

The village has a population of 1,400.

== History ==
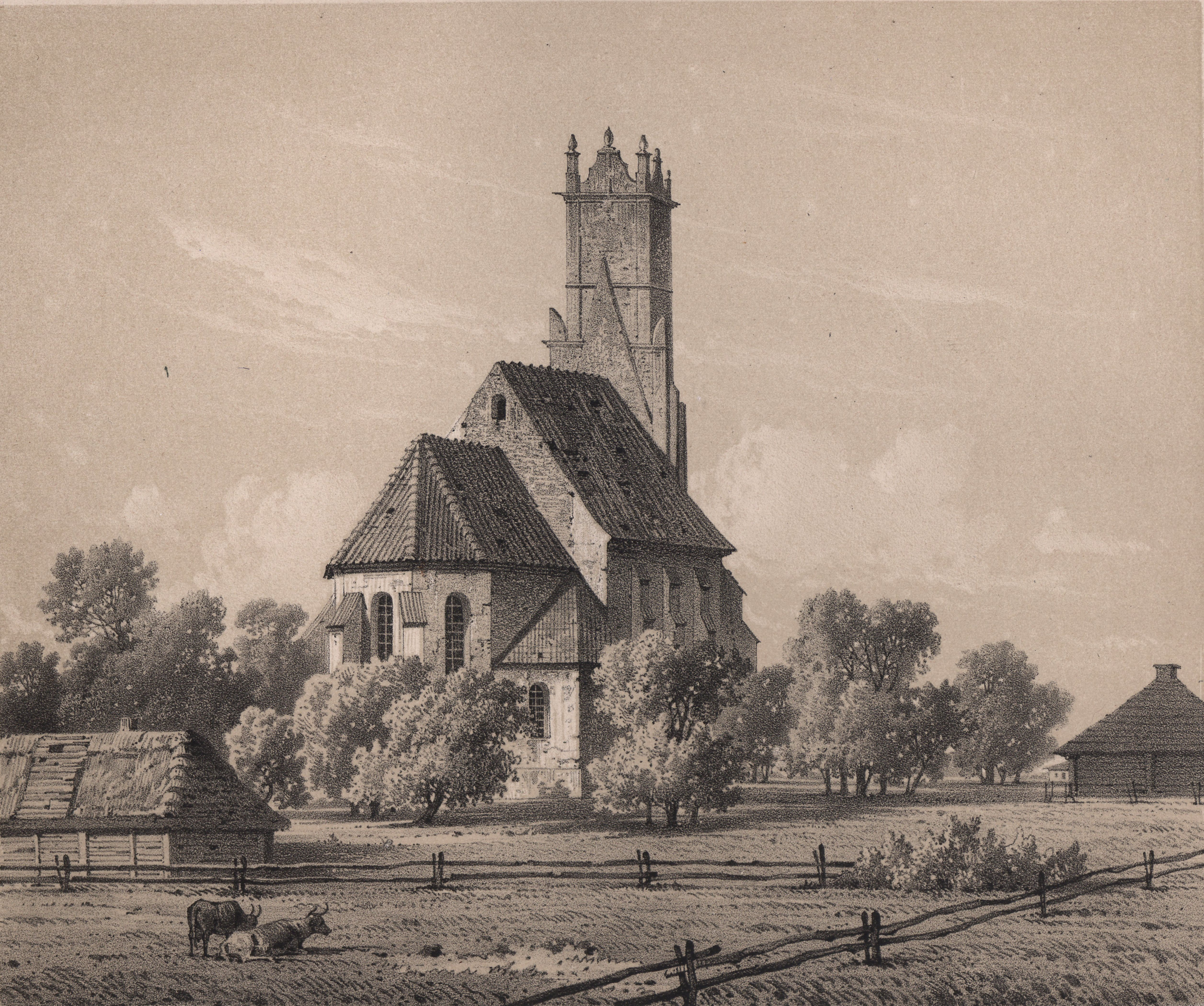
Holy Trinity church in the mid-19th century

Chodel was founded in 1440. In c. 1530, castellan of Lublin, Bernard Maciejowski established the Renaissance Holy Trinity church, the local landmark church. Chodel was a rural town, whose populace was employed in agriculture. It had a population of 582 as of 1860.

Following the German-Soviet invasion of Poland, which started World War II in September 1939, the town was occupied by Nazi Germany. During the Holocaust, the Jewish population of the town—numbering 750 to 950—was murdered.
