= 11948 Justinehénin =

Themistian asteroid from the outer region of the asteroid belt

Discovery
- Discovered by: E. W. Elst
- Discovery site: CERGA (Caussols Obs.)
- Discovery date: 18 August 1993

Designations
- Named after: Justine Henin (Belgian tennis player)
- Alternative designations: 1993 QQ_{4} · 1973 AE_{3} 1991 EJ_{8} · 1997 GW_{24}
- Minor planet category: main-belt · (inner); Themis

Orbital characteristics
- Epoch 4 September 2017 (JD 2458000.5)
- Uncertainty parameter 0
- Observation arc: 44.01 yr (16,076 days)
- Aphelion: 3.5804 AU
- Perihelion: 2.8195 AU
- Semi-major axis: 3.2000 AU
- Eccentricity: 0.1189
- Orbital period (sidereal): 5.72 yr (2,091 days)
- Mean anomaly: 168.53°
- Mean motion: 0° 10^{m} 19.92^{s} / day
- Inclination: 1.8914°
- Longitude of ascending node: 159.16°
- Argument of perihelion: 75.735°

Physical characteristics
- Dimensions: 12 km (calculated at 0.06)
- Absolute magnitude (H): 13.2

11948 Justinehénin, provisional designation 1993 QQ_{4}, is a Themistian asteroid from the outer region of the asteroid belt, approximately 12 kilometers in diameter.

The asteroid was discovered on 18 August 1993, by Belgian astronomer Eric Elst at CERGA (010) in Caussols, southeastern France. It was named for tennis player Justine Henin.

== Orbit and classification ==
Justinehénin orbits the Sun in the outer main-belt at a distance of 2.8–3.6 AU once every 5 years and 9 months (2,091 days). Its orbit has an eccentricity of 0.12 and an inclination of 2° with respect to the ecliptic. The first identification was made at Crimea–Nauchnij in 1973, extending the asteroid's observation arc by 31 years prior to its discovery.

== Physical characteristics ==
=== Diameter and albedo ===
Based on an absolute magnitude of 13.2, Justinehénin potentially measures between 6 and 14 kilometers in diameter, assuming an albedo in the range of 0.05 to 0.25. Since asteroids in the outer main-belt are mostly of a carbonaceous rather than of a silicaceous composition, with low albedos, typically around 0.06, Justinehénin's diameter might be on the upper end of NASA's published conversion table, as the lower the body's reflectivity (albedo), the larger its diameter at a constant absolute magnitude (brightness).

=== Lightcurves ===
As of 2017, the asteroid's effective size, its composition and albedo, as well as its rotation period and shape remain unknown.

== Naming ==
This minor planet was named for Belgian former professional tennis player Justine Henin (born 1985). Although her name (usually) contains no acute accent, the asteroid's official name does. The official naming citation was published by the Minor Planet Center on 10 September 2003 (M.P.C. 49674).
