= Henryk Michał Kamieński =

Polish philosopher

Henryk Michał Kamieński (1813–1865) was a Polish philosopher. He was a leader in the Polish irridentist circles. Early in his life he partook in the November Uprising. After the amnesty he worked on philosophical and economic work. He became affiliated with the Polish emigréé circles and the Polish Democratic Society. He was arrested in 1845 and sent to work in Siberia for 5 years. After his release he went to work in Switzerland. He is associated with his cousin Edward Dembowski. His democratic philosophy influenced important Polish statesmen Józef Piłsudski and Roman Dmowski.

== Works ==
- Diaries and sketches, 1951
- Vital truths of the Polish nation, 1844
- Democratic Catechism, 1849
- Le Russie et l’avenir, 1858
- Philosophy of the social economy of human society, 1843–45
- Mr. Józef Bojalski, 1854.
