= Opole County, Lublin Voivodeship =

Opole County Powiat opolski
- County
- Flag Coat of arms

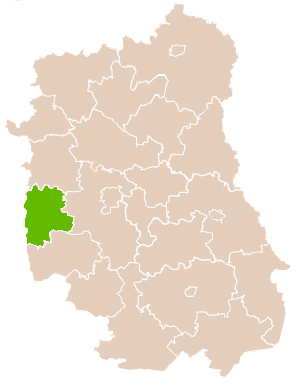
- Coordinates (Opole Lubelskie): 51°9′N 21°58′E
- Country: Poland
- Voivodeship: Lublin
- Seat: Opole Lubelskie
- Gminas: Total 7: Gmina Chodel; Gmina Józefów nad Wisłą; Gmina Karczmiska; Gmina Łaziska; Gmina Opole Lubelskie; Gmina Poniatowa; Gmina Wilków

Area
  - Total: 804.14 km^{2} (310.48 sq mi)

Population (2019)
  - Total: 59,551
  - Density: 74.056/km^{2} (191.80/sq mi)
  - Urban: 18,480
  - Rural: 41,031
- Car plates: LOP
- Website: www.opole.lublin.pl

Opole County (Polish: powiat opolski) is a unit of territorial administration and local government (powiat) in Lublin Voivodeship, eastern Poland. It was established on January 1, 1999, as a result of the Polish local government reforms passed in 1998. Its administrative seat is the town of Opole Lubelskie, which lies 44 kilometres (27 mi) west of the regional capital Lublin. The only other town in the county is Poniatowa, lying 8 km (5 mi) north-east of Opole Lubelskie.

The county covers an area of 804.14 square kilometres (310.5 sq mi). As of 2019, its total population is 59,511, including 9,144 in Poniatowa, 8,421 in Opole Lubelskie, 915 in Józefów nad Wisłą, and a rural population of 41,031.

== Neighbouring counties ==
Opole County is bordered by Puławy County to the north, Lublin County to the east, Kraśnik County to the south-east, Opatów County to the south-west, Lipsko County to the west and Zwoleń County to the north-west.

== Administrative divisions ==
The county is subdivided into seven gminas (three urban-rural and four rural). These are listed in the following table, in descending order of population.

Gmina	Type	Area (km^{2})	Population (2019)	Seat
Gmina Opole Lubelskie	urban-rural	193.8	17,166	Opole Lubelskie
Gmina Poniatowa	urban-rural	84.2	14,223	Poniatowa
Gmina Chodel	rural	108.2	6,589	Chodel
Gmina Józefów nad Wisłą	urban-rural	141.6	6,548	Józefów nad Wisłą
Gmina Karczmiska	rural	95.2	5,607	Karczmiska
Gmina Łaziska	rural	109.3	4,945	Łaziska
Gmina Wilków	rural	79.5	4,863	Wilków
