= Zemborzyn =

Zemborzyn may refer to the following places in Poland:

- Zemborzyn Drugi
- Zemborzyn Kościelny
- Zemborzyn Pierwszy
- Zemborzyn-Kolonia
