= Boiska-Kolonia =

Boiska-Kolonia refers to the following places in Poland:

- Boiska-Kolonia, Lublin Voivodeship
- Boiska-Kolonia, Masovian Voivodeship
