= Czekarzewice =

Czekarzewice may refer to the following places in Poland:

- Czekarzewice Drugie
- Czekarzewice Pierwsze
