= Brzozowa, Opatów County =

Brzozowa
- Village
- Location within Poland
- Coordinates: 50°57′55″N 21°40′3″E
- Country: Poland
- Voivodeship: Świętokrzyskie
- County: Opatów
- Gmina: Tarłów
- Population: 360

Brzozowa [bʐɔˈzɔva] is a village in the administrative district of Gmina Tarłów, within Opatów County, Świętokrzyskie Voivodeship, in south-central Poland. It lies approximately 6 km (4 mi) south-west of Tarłów, 25 km (16 mi) north-east of Opatów, and 75 km (47 mi) east of the regional capital Kielce.
