= Duranów =

- Village
- Location within Poland
- Coordinates: 50°57′57″N 21°37′41″E
- Country: Poland
- Voivodeship: Świętokrzyskie
- County: Opatów
- Gmina: Tarłów
- Population: 260

Duranów [duˈranuf] is a village in the administrative district of Gmina Tarłów, within Opatów County, Świętokrzyskie Voivodeship, in south-central Poland. It lies approximately 8 km (5 mi) south-west of Tarłów, 23 km (14 mi) north-east of Opatów, and 72 km (45 mi) east of the regional capital Kielce.
