= Teofilów =

Teofilów may refer to the following places:

- Teofilów, Gmina Drużbice in Łódź Voivodeship (central Poland)
- Teofilów, Gmina Inowłódz, Tomaszów County in Łódź Voivodeship (central Poland)
- Teofilów, Świętokrzyskie Voivodeship (south-central Poland)
- Teofilów, Masovian Voivodeship (east-central Poland)
