= Julianów, Gmina Tarłów =

- Village
- Location within Poland
- Coordinates: 50°57′48″N 21°44′18″E
- Country: Poland
- Voivodeship: Świętokrzyskie
- County: Opatów
- Gmina: Tarłów

Population
  - Total: 180

Julianów [juˈljanuf] is a village in the administrative district of Gmina Tarłów, within Opatów County, Świętokrzyskie Voivodeship, in south-central Poland. It lies approximately 5 km (3 mi) south of Tarłów, 29 km (18 mi) north-east of Opatów, and 80 km (50 mi) east of the regional capital Kielce.
