= Tomaszów, Gmina Tarłów =

Tomaszów
- Village
- Location within Poland
- Coordinates: 50°59′25″N 21°44′56″E
- Country: Poland
- Voivodeship: Świętokrzyskie
- County: Opatów
- Gmina: Tarłów
- Population: 70

Tomaszów [tɔˈmaʂuf] is a village in the administrative district of Gmina Tarłów, within Opatów County, Świętokrzyskie Voivodeship, in south-central Poland. It lies approximately 3 km (2 mi) south-east of Tarłów, 31 km (19 mi) north-east of Opatów, and 81 km (50 mi) east of the regional capital Kielce.
