= Pielgrzymka =

Pielgrzymka may refer to the following places in Poland:

- Pielgrzymka, Lower Silesian Voivodeship (south-west Poland)
- Pielgrzymka, Lublin Voivodeship (east Poland)
- Pielgrzymka, Subcarpathian Voivodeship (south-east Poland)
