= Jadwigów, Opatów County =

Jadwigów
- Village
- Location within Poland
- Coordinates: 50°57′8″N 21°43′5″E
- Country: Poland
- Voivodeship: Świętokrzyskie
- County: Opatów
- Gmina: Tarłów
- Population: 50

Jadwigów [jadˈviɡuf] is a village in the administrative district of Gmina Tarłów, within Opatów County, Świętokrzyskie Voivodeship, in south-central Poland. It lies approximately 6 km (4 mi) south of Tarłów, 27 km (17 mi) north-east of Opatów, and 78 km (48 mi) east of the regional capital Kielce.
