= Ciszyca Przewozowa =

- Village
- Location within Poland
- Coordinates: 51°2′56″N 21°48′7″E
- Country: Poland
- Voivodeship: Świętokrzyskie
- County: Opatów
- Gmina: Tarłów
- Population: 70

Ciszyca Przewozowa [t͡ɕiˈʂɨt͡sa pʂɛvɔˈzɔva] is a village in the administrative district of Gmina Tarłów, within Opatów County, Świętokrzyskie Voivodeship, in south-central Poland. It lies approximately 9 km (6 mi) north-east of Tarłów, 38 km (24 mi) north-east of Opatów, and 86 km (53 mi) east of the regional capital Kielce.
