= Ciszyca-Kolonia =

- Village
- Location within Poland
- Coordinates: 51°1′0″N 21°46′18″E
- Country: Poland
- Voivodeship: Świętokrzyskie
- County: Opatów
- Gmina: Tarłów
- Population: 90

Ciszyca-Kolonia [t͡ɕiˈʂɨt͡sa kɔˈlɔɲa] is a village in the administrative district of Gmina Tarłów, within Opatów County, Świętokrzyskie Voivodeship, in south-central Poland. It lies approximately 5 km (3 mi) east of Tarłów, 34 km (21 mi) north-east of Opatów, and 83 km (52 mi) east of the regional capital Kielce.
