= Wólka Lipowa =

- Village
- Location within Poland
- Coordinates: 50°57′29″N 21°41′59″E
- Country: Poland
- Voivodeship: Świętokrzyskie
- County: Opatów
- Gmina: Tarłów
- Population: 170

Wólka Lipowa [ˈvulka liˈpɔva] is a village in the administrative district of Gmina Tarłów, in Opatów County, Świętokrzyskie Voivodeship, in south-central Poland. It lies approximately 5 km (3 mi) south of Tarłów, 26 km (16 mi) north-east of Opatów, and 77 km (48 mi) east of the regional capital Kielce.
