= Dąbrówka, Opatów County =

Dąbrówka
- Village
- Location within Poland
- Coordinates: 50°55′51″N 21°41′56″E
- Country: Poland
- Voivodeship: Świętokrzyskie
- County: Opatów
- Gmina: Tarłów

Dąbrówka [dɔmˈbrufka] is a village in the administrative district of Gmina Tarłów, within Opatów County, Świętokrzyskie Voivodeship, in south-central Poland. It lies approximately 8 km (5 mi) south of Tarłów, 24 km (15 mi) north-east of Opatów, and 77 km (48 mi) east of the regional capital Kielce.
