= Maksymów =

Maksymów may refer to the following places:

- Maksymów, Radomsko County in Łódź Voivodeship (central Poland)
- Maksymów, Tomaszów County in Łódź Voivodeship (central Poland)
- Maksymów, Wieruszów County in Łódź Voivodeship (central Poland)
- Maksymów, Świętokrzyskie Voivodeship (south-central Poland)
