= Ciszyca Górna =

- Village
- Location within Poland
- Coordinates: 51°1′40″N 21°46′29″E
- Country: Poland
- Voivodeship: Świętokrzyskie
- County: Opatów
- Gmina: Tarłów
- Population: 240

Ciszyca Górna [t͡ɕiˈʂɨt͡sa ˈɡurna] is a village in the administrative district of Gmina Tarłów, within Opatów County, Świętokrzyskie Voivodeship, in south-central Poland. It lies approximately 6 km (4 mi) north-east of Tarłów, 35 km (22 mi) north-east of Opatów, and 83 km (52 mi) east of the regional capital Kielce.
