= Ciszyca Dolna =

- Village
- Location within Poland
- Coordinates: 51°2′22″N 21°47′38″E
- Country: Poland
- Voivodeship: Świętokrzyskie
- County: Opatów
- Gmina: Tarłów
- Population: 250

Ciszyca Dolna [t͡ɕiˈʂɨt͡sa ˈdɔlna] is a village in the administrative district of Gmina Tarłów, within Opatów County, Świętokrzyskie Voivodeship, in south-central Poland. It lies approximately 7 km (4 mi) north-east of Tarłów, 37 km (23 mi) north-east of Opatów, and 85 km (53 mi) east of the regional capital Kielce.
