= Słupia Nadbrzeżna =

- Village
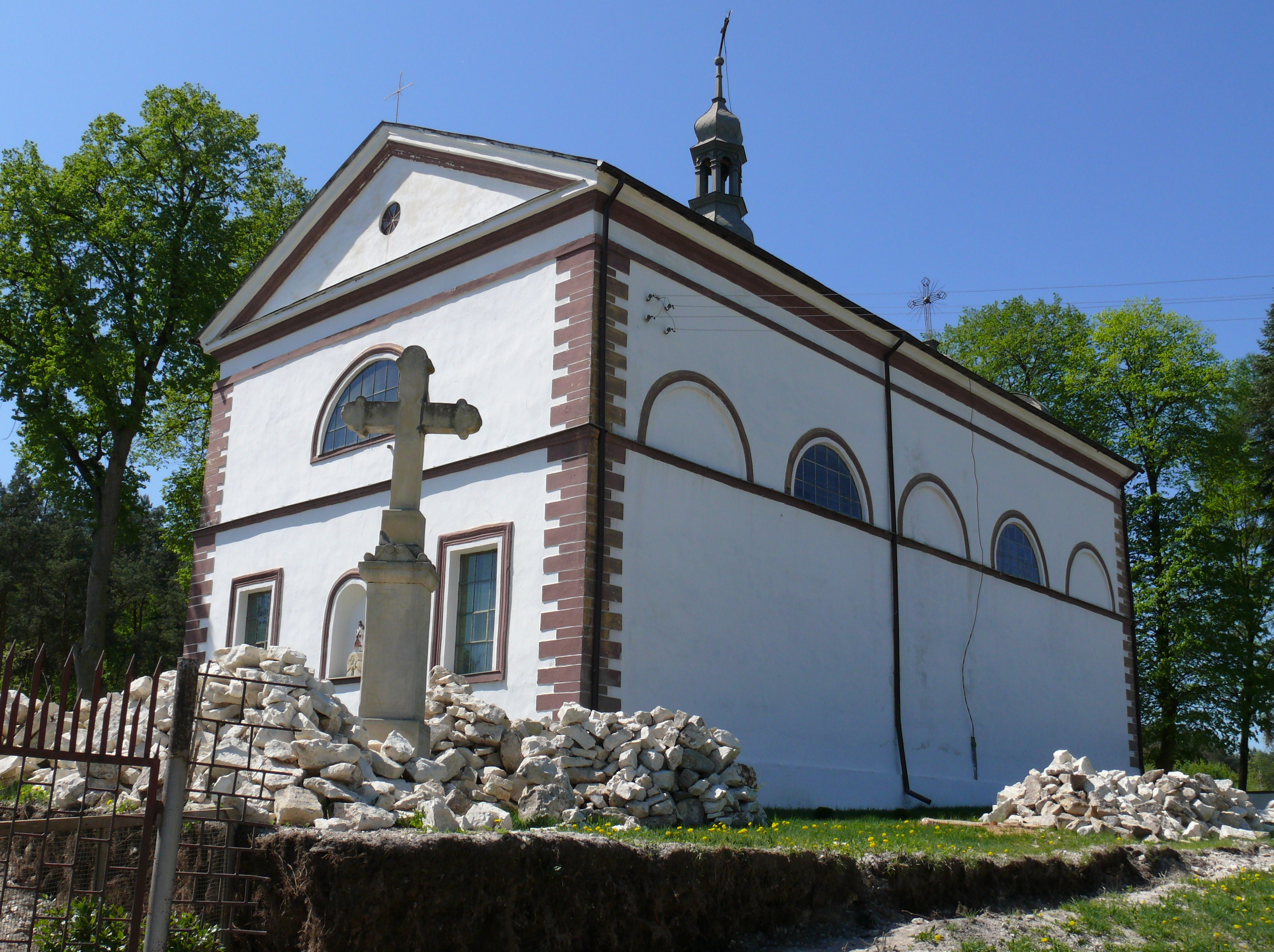
- Church of Saint Barbara

- Location within Poland
- Coordinates: 50°56′45″N 21°48′9″E
- Country: Poland
- Voivodeship: Świętokrzyskie
- County: Opatów
- Gmina: Tarłów

Population
  - Total: 200

Słupia Nadbrzeżna [ˈswupja nadˈbʐɛʐna] is a village in the administrative district of Gmina Tarłów, within Opatów County, Świętokrzyskie Voivodeship, in south-central Poland. It lies approximately 9 km (6 mi) south-east of Tarłów, 31 km (19 mi) north-east of Opatów, and 84 km (52 mi) east of the regional capital Kielce.

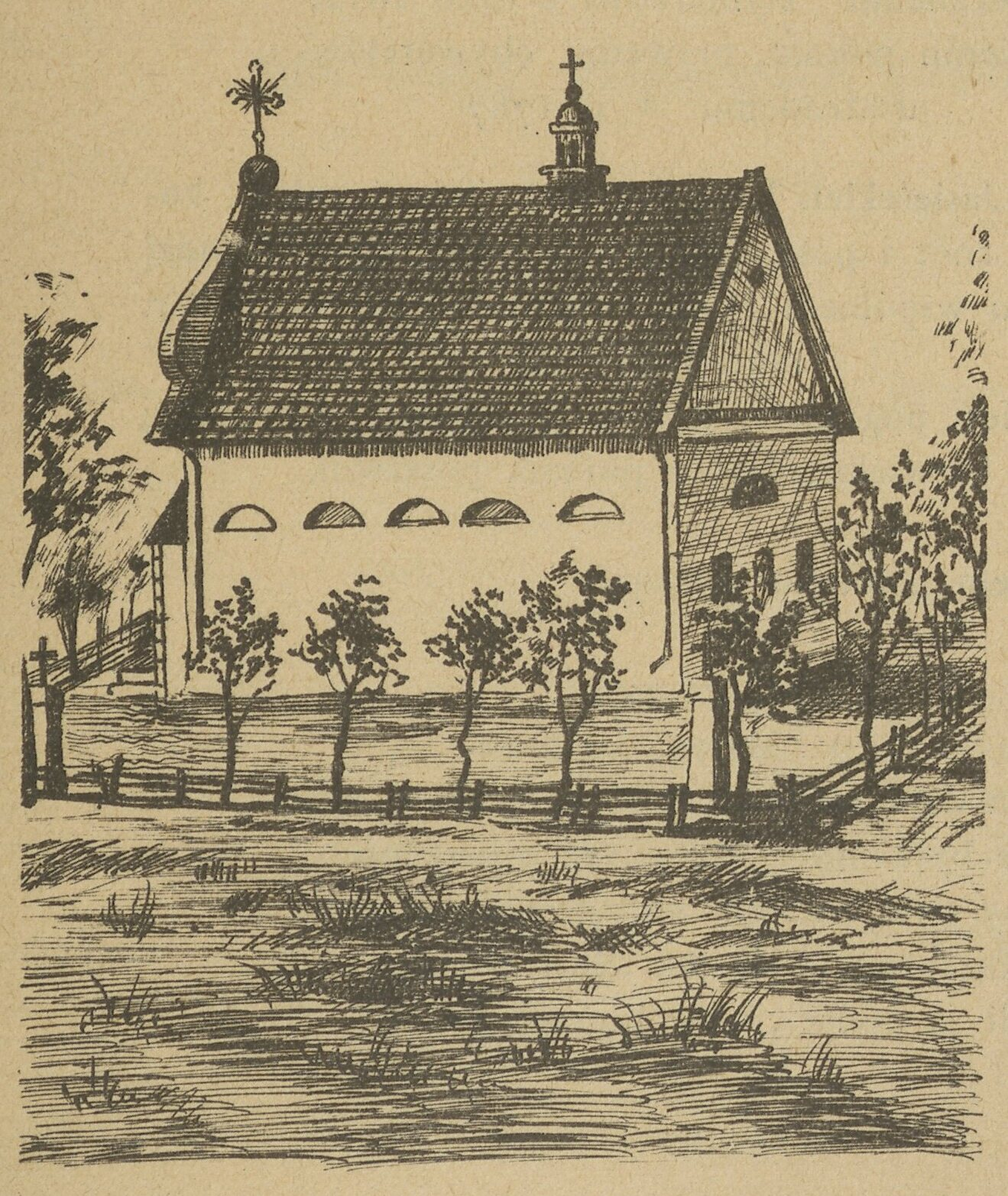
Saint Barbara church before 1907
