= Sulejów (disambiguation) =

Sulejów may refer to the following places:

- Sulejów in Łódź Voivodeship (central Poland)
- Sulejów, Masovian Voivodeship (east-central Poland)
- Sulejów, Świętokrzyskie Voivodeship (south-central Poland)
