= First Battle of Chruślina =

1863 battle

The First Battle of Chruślina was a clash between Polish insurgent forces and units of the Imperial Russian Army during the January Uprising. It took place on 30 May 1863 near the village of Chruślina, which at that time belonged to Russian-controlled Congress Poland. Insurgent forces, commanded by Marcin Borelowski and Zygmunt Koskowski (180 men altogether) fought off a Russian detachment. The Poles lost 22 men; Russian losses were higher, but due to Russian numerical superiority, the insurgents had to withdraw towards Garwolin.

== Sources ==
- Stefan Kieniewicz: Powstanie styczniowe. Warszawa: Państwowe Wydawnictwo Naukowe, 1983. ISBN 83-01-03652-4.
