= Wesołówka, Świętokrzyskie Voivodeship =

Wesołówka
- Village
- Location within Poland
- Coordinates: 50°58′14″N 21°47′50″E
- Country: Poland
- Voivodeship: Świętokrzyskie
- County: Opatów
- Gmina: Tarłów
- Population: 90

Wesołówka [vɛsɔˈwufka] is a village in the administrative district of Gmina Tarłów, within Opatów County, Świętokrzyskie Voivodeship, in south-central Poland. It lies approximately 7 km (4 mi) south-east of Tarłów, 32 km (20 mi) north-east of Opatów, and 84 km (52 mi) east of the regional capital Kielce.
