= Mieczysławów, Świętokrzyskie Voivodeship =

Mieczysławów
- Village
- Location within Poland
- Coordinates: 50°56′47″N 21°43′44″E
- Country: Poland
- Voivodeship: Świętokrzyskie
- County: Opatów
- Gmina: Tarłów
- Population: 100

Mieczysławów [mjɛt͡ʂɨˈswavuf] is a village in the administrative district of Gmina Tarłów, within Opatów County, Świętokrzyskie Voivodeship, in south-central Poland. It lies approximately 7 km (4 mi) south of Tarłów, 27 km (17 mi) north-east of Opatów, and 79 km (49 mi) east of the regional capital Kielce.
