= Cegielnia =

Cegielnia may refer to the following places:

- Cegielnia, Kuyavian-Pomeranian Voivodeship (north-central Poland)
- Cegielnia, Hrubieszów County in Lublin Voivodeship (east Poland)
- Cegielnia, Janów County in Lublin Voivodeship (east Poland)
- Cegielnia, Białystok County in Podlaskie Voivodeship (north-east Poland)
- Cegielnia, Lubartów County in Lublin Voivodeship (east Poland)
- Cegielnia, Lublin County in Lublin Voivodeship (east Poland)
- Cegielnia, Świętokrzyskie Voivodeship (south-central Poland)
- Cegielnia, Grójec County in Masovian Voivodeship (east-central Poland)
- Cegielnia, Płock County in Masovian Voivodeship (east-central Poland)
- Cegielnia, Przasnysz County in Masovian Voivodeship (east-central Poland)
- Cegielnia, Wołomin County in Masovian Voivodeship (east-central Poland)
- Cegielnia, Gmina Kleczew in Greater Poland Voivodeship (west-central Poland)
- Cegielnia, Gmina Wilczyn in Greater Poland Voivodeship (west-central Poland)
- Cegielnia, Krotoszyn County in Greater Poland Voivodeship (west-central Poland)
- Cegielnia, Silesian Voivodeship (south Poland)
- Cegielnia, Chojnice County in Pomeranian Voivodeship (north Poland)
- Cegielnia, Wejherowo County in Pomeranian Voivodeship (north Poland)
- Cegielnia, Warmian-Masurian Voivodeship (north Poland)
