= Słupia Nadbrzeżna-Kolonia =

- Village
- Location within Poland
- Coordinates: 50°56′12″N 21°48′13″E
- Country: Poland
- Voivodeship: Świętokrzyskie
- County: Opatów
- Gmina: Tarłów
- Population: 150

Słupia Nadbrzeżna-Kolonia [ˈswupja nadˈbʐɛʐna kɔˈlɔɲa] is a village in the administrative district of Gmina Tarłów, within Opatów County, Świętokrzyskie Voivodeship, in south-central Poland. It lies approximately 10 km (6 mi) south-east of Tarłów, 31 km (19 mi) north-east of Opatów, and 84 km (52 mi) east of the regional capital Kielce.
