= Kolczyn =

Kolczyn may refer to the following places in Poland:

- Kolczyn, Masovian Voivodeship
- Kolczyn, Lublin Voivodeship
- Kołczyn, Lublin Voivodeship
- Kołczyn, Lubusz Voivodeship
