= Nieszawa (disambiguation) =

Nieszawa is a town in Kuyavian-Pomeranian Voivodeship, north-central Poland.

- Statutes of Nieszawa, enacted in 1454

Nieszawa may also refer to the following villages:

- Nieszawa, Lublin Voivodeship (east Poland)
- Nieszawa, Greater Poland Voivodeship (west-central Poland)
