= Kozłówek =

Kozłówek may refer to the following places:

- Kozłówek, Pomeranian Voivodeship (north Poland)
- Kozłówek, Subcarpathian Voivodeship (south-east Poland)
- Kozłówek, Świętokrzyskie Voivodeship (south-central Poland)
- Kozłówek, informal common name of the Osiedle na Kozłówku neighbourhood in Prokocim, Cracow.
