= Łubowa =

- Village
- Location within Poland
- Coordinates: 50°56′11″N 21°43′16″E
- Country: Poland
- Voivodeship: Świętokrzyskie
- County: Opatów
- Gmina: Tarłów
- Population: 40

Łubowa [wuˈbɔva] is a village in the administrative district of Gmina Tarłów, within Opatów County, Świętokrzyskie Voivodeship, in south-central Poland. It lies approximately 8 km (5 mi) south of Tarłów, 26 km (16 mi) north-east of Opatów, and 78 km (48 mi) east of the regional capital Kielce.
