= Ostrów, Opatów County =

Ostrów
- Village
- Location within Poland
- Coordinates: 51°3′26″N 21°48′20″E
- Country: Poland
- Voivodeship: Świętokrzyskie
- County: Opatów
- Gmina: Tarłów
- Population: 120

Ostrów [ˈɔstruf] is a village in the administrative district of Gmina Tarłów, within Opatów County, Świętokrzyskie Voivodeship, in south-central Poland. It lies approximately 9 km (6 mi) north-east of Tarłów, 39 km (24 mi) north-east of Opatów, and 86 km (53 mi) east of the regional capital Kielce.
