= Bronisławów =

Bronisławów may refer to the following places:

- Bronisławów, Kutno County in Łódź Voivodeship (central Poland)
- Bronisławów, Piotrków County in Łódź Voivodeship (central Poland)
- Bronisławów, Rawa County in Łódź Voivodeship (central Poland)
- Bronisławów, Sieradz County in Łódź Voivodeship (central Poland)
- Bronisławów, Tomaszów County in Łódź Voivodeship (central Poland)
- Bronisławów, Zgierz County in Łódź Voivodeship (central Poland)
- Bronisławów, Świętokrzyskie Voivodeship (south-central Poland)
- Bronisławów, Białobrzegi County in Masovian Voivodeship (east-central Poland)
- Bronisławów, Grodzisk County in Masovian Voivodeship (east-central Poland)
- Bronisławów, Gmina Błędów in Masovian Voivodeship (east-central Poland)
- Bronisławów, Gmina Jasieniec in Masovian Voivodeship (east-central Poland)
- Bronisławów, Lipsko County in Masovian Voivodeship (east-central Poland)
- Bronisławów, Piaseczno County in Masovian Voivodeship (east-central Poland)
- Bronisławów, Żyrardów County in Masovian Voivodeship (east-central Poland)
