= Leopoldów, Świętokrzyskie Voivodeship =

Leopoldów
- Village
- Location within Poland
- Coordinates: 50°57′27″N 21°47′16″E
- Country: Poland
- Voivodeship: Świętokrzyskie
- County: Opatów
- Gmina: Tarłów
- Population: 40

Leopoldów [lɛɔˈpɔlduf] is a village in the administrative district of Gmina Tarłów, within Opatów County, Świętokrzyskie Voivodeship, in south-central Poland. It lies approximately 8 km (5 mi) south-east of Tarłów, 31 km (19 mi) north-east of Opatów, and 83 km (52 mi) east of the regional capital Kielce.
