= Spławy =

Spławy may refer to the following places:

- Spławy, Lublin County in Lublin Voivodeship (east Poland)
- Spławy, Gmina Józefów nad Wisłą in Lublin Voivodeship (east Poland)
- Spławy, Gmina Poniatowa in Lublin Voivodeship (east Poland)
