= Boiska =

- Village
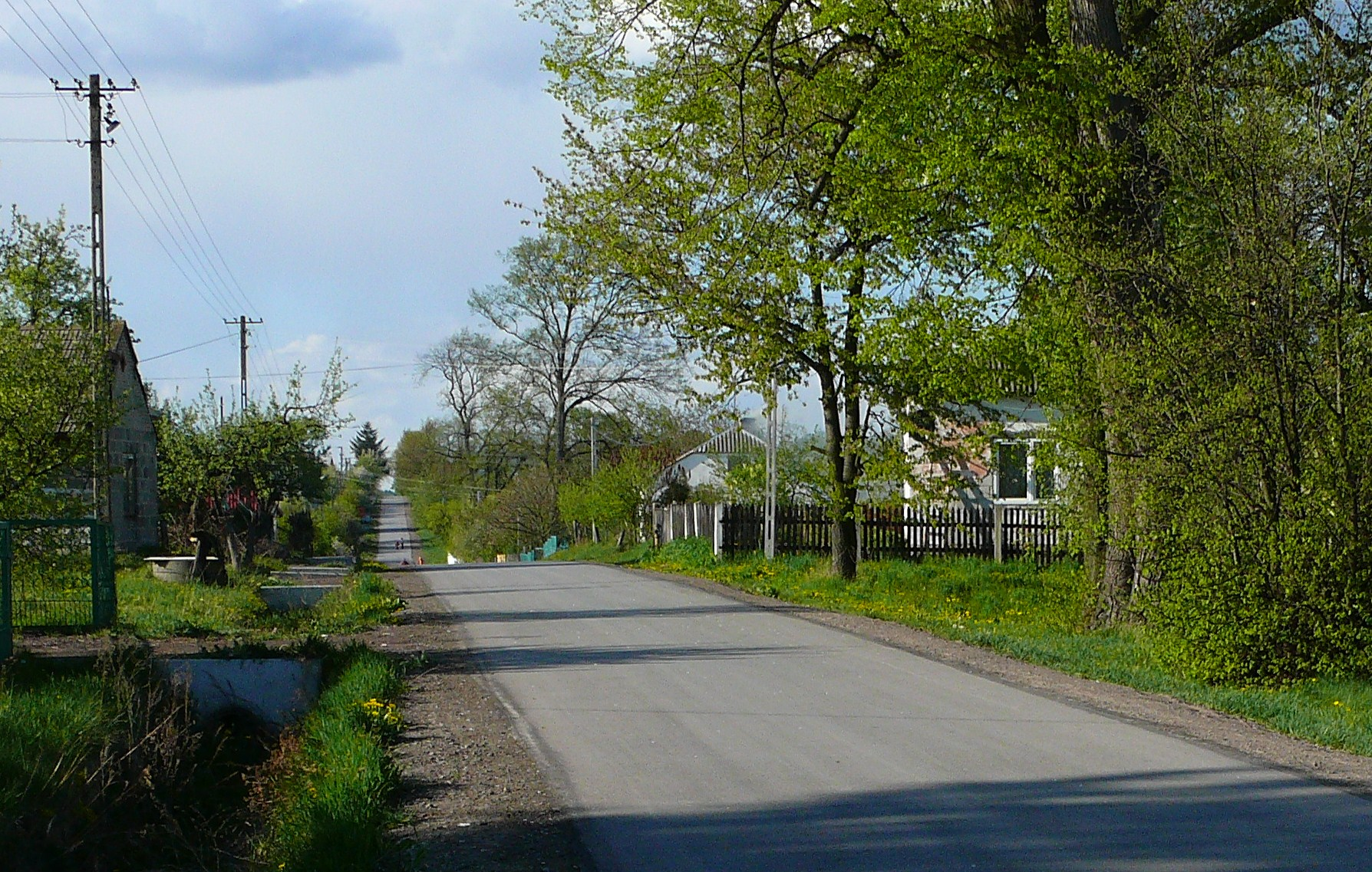

- Location within Poland
- Coordinates: 51°10′36″N 21°45′59″E
- Country: Poland
- Voivodeship: Masovian
- County: Lipsko
- Gmina: Solec nad Wisłą

Boiska [ˈbɔiska] is a village in the administrative district of Gmina Solec nad Wisłą in Lipsko County, Masovian Voivodeship, in east-central Poland. It is approximately 5 km (3 mi) north of Solec nad Wisłą, 8 km (5 mi) east of Lipsko, and 127 km (79 mi) southeast of Warsaw.

== History ==
A village known in 1380 as Boiszka, 5 km N of Solec nad Wisłą, on the left bank of the Vistula; about 60 km NE of the monastery, 4 km W of the ancient monastery estate of Braciejowice.

Since 1459, it has been the property of the Świętokrzyskie monastery. Before that, it belonged to the noble Jan z Boiska.
