= Janów, Gmina Tarłów =

Janów
- Village
- Location within Poland
- Coordinates: 51°1′1″N 21°44′18″E
- Country: Poland
- Voivodeship: Świętokrzyskie
- County: Opatów
- Gmina: Tarłów
- Population: 130

Janów [ˈjanuf] is a village in the administrative district of Gmina Tarłów, within Opatów County, Świętokrzyskie Voivodeship, in south-central Poland. It lies approximately 3 km (2 mi) north-east of Tarłów, 33 km (21 mi) north-east of Opatów, and 81 km (50 mi) east of the regional capital Kielce.
