= Tadeuszów, Świętokrzyskie Voivodeship =

Tadeuszów
- Village
- Location within Poland
- Coordinates: 50°56′49″N 21°45′45″E
- Country: Poland
- Voivodeship: Świętokrzyskie
- County: Opatów
- Gmina: Tarłów
- Population: 150

Tadeuszów [tadɛˈuʂuf] is a village in the administrative district of Gmina Tarłów, within Opatów County, Świętokrzyskie Voivodeship, in south-central Poland. It lies approximately 7 km (4 mi) south-east of Tarłów, 29 km (18 mi) north-east of Opatów, and 81 km (50 mi) east of the regional capital Kielce.
