= Potoczek =

Potoczek may refer to:

- Potoczek, Głogów County in Lower Silesian Voivodeship (south-west Poland)
- Potoczek, Kłodzko County in Lower Silesian Voivodeship (south-west Poland)
- Potoczek, Janów County in Lublin Voivodeship (east Poland)
- Potoczek, Zamość County in Lublin Voivodeship (east Poland)
- Potoczek, Świętokrzyskie Voivodeship (south-central Poland)
