= Kolonia Dąbrówka =

- Village
- Location within Poland
- Coordinates: 51°0′29″N 21°45′1″E
- Country: Poland
- Voivodeship: Świętokrzyskie
- County: Opatów
- Gmina: Tarłów
- Population: 50

Kolonia Dąbrówka [kɔˈlɔɲa dɔmˈbrufka] is a village in the administrative district of Gmina Tarłów, within Opatów County, Świętokrzyskie Voivodeship, in south-central Poland. It lies approximately 3 km (2 mi) east of Tarłów, 33 km (21 mi) north-east of Opatów, and 81 km (50 mi) east of the regional capital Kielce.
