= Hermanów, Świętokrzyskie Voivodeship =

Hermanów
- Village
- Location within Poland
- Coordinates: 50°59′12″N 21°45′47″E
- Country: Poland
- Voivodeship: Świętokrzyskie
- County: Opatów
- Gmina: Tarłów
- Population: 100

Hermanów [xɛrˈmanuf] is a village in the administrative district of Gmina Tarłów, within Opatów County, Świętokrzyskie Voivodeship, in south-central Poland. It lies approximately 4 km (2 mi) south-east of Tarłów, 32 km (20 mi) north-east of Opatów, and 82 km (51 mi) east of the regional capital Kielce.
