= Wólka Tarłowska =

- Village
- Location within Poland
- Coordinates: 50°59′31″N 21°43′0″E
- Country: Poland
- Voivodeship: Świętokrzyskie
- County: Opatów
- Gmina: Tarłów
- Population: 280

Wólka Tarłowska [ˈvulka tarˈwɔfska] is a village in the administrative district of Gmina Tarłów, within Opatów County, Świętokrzyskie Voivodeship, in south-central Poland. It lies approximately 2 km (1 mi) south of Tarłów, 30 km (19 mi) north-east of Opatów, and 79 km (49 mi) east of the regional capital Kielce.
