= Wałowice, Lublin Voivodeship =

Wałowice
- Village
- Location within Poland
- Coordinates: 50°59′17″N 21°50′11″E
- Country: Poland
- Voivodeship: Lublin
- County: Opole
- Gmina: Józefów nad Wisłą

Wałowice [vawɔˈvit͡sɛ] is a village in the administrative district of Gmina Józefów nad Wisłą, within Opole County, Lublin Voivodeship, in eastern Poland.
