= Teofilów, Świętokrzyskie Voivodeship =

Teofilów
- Village
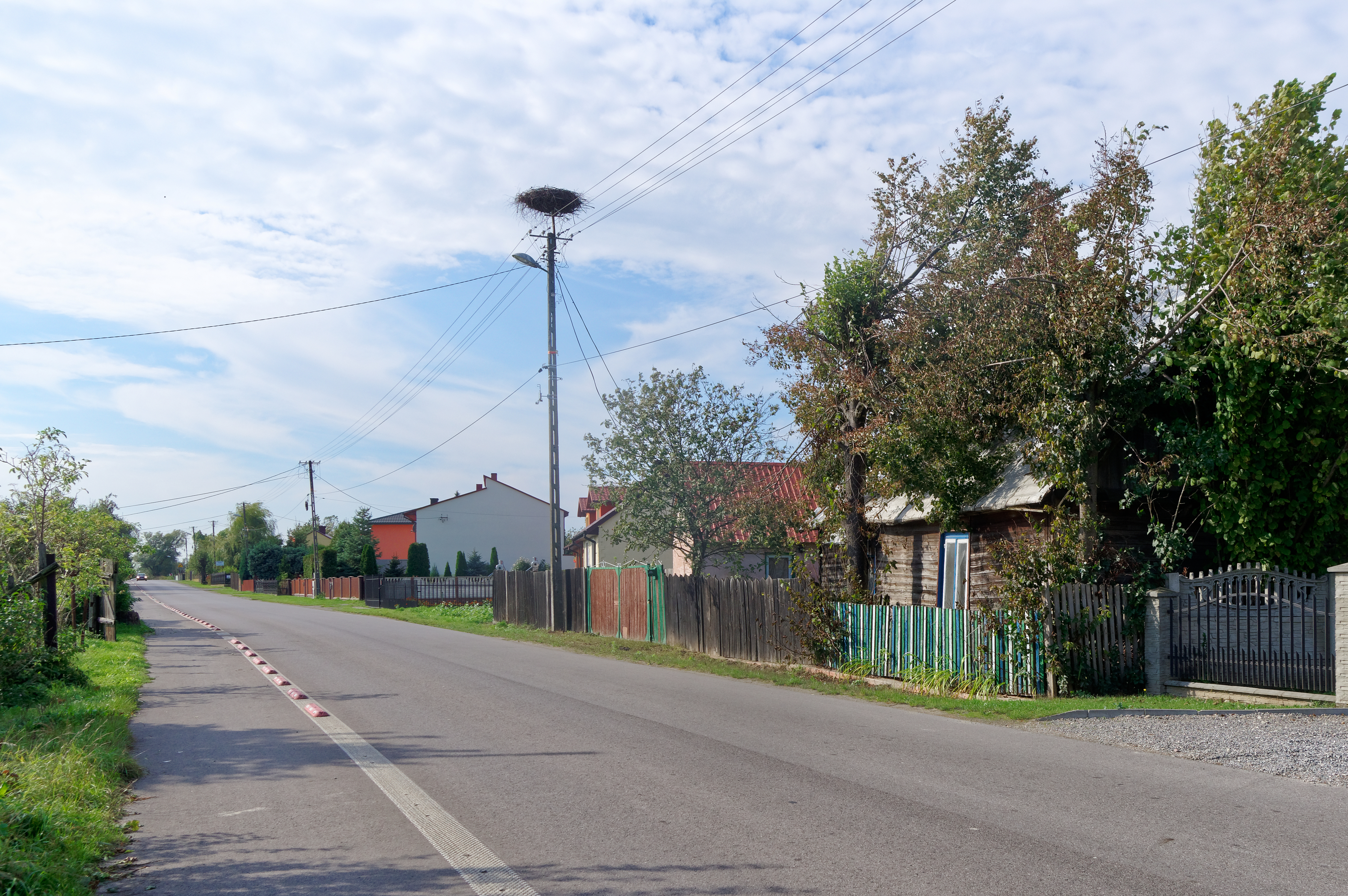

- Location within Poland
- Coordinates: 50°58′2″N 21°36′29″E
- Country: Poland
- Voivodeship: Świętokrzyskie
- County: Opatów
- Gmina: Tarłów
- Population: 280

Teofilów [tɛɔˈfiluf] is a village in the administrative district of Gmina Tarłów, within Opatów County, Świętokrzyskie Voivodeship, in south-central Poland. It lies approximately 9 km (6 mi) south-west of Tarłów, 23 km (14 mi) north-east of Opatów, and 71 km (44 mi) east of the regional capital Kielce.
