= Mazanów =

- Village
- Location within Poland
- Coordinates: 51°0′2″N 21°54′36″E
- Country: Poland
- Voivodeship: Lublin
- County: Opole
- Gmina: Józefów nad Wisłą

Mazanów [maˈzanuf] is a village in the administrative district of Gmina Józefów nad Wisłą, within Opole County, Lublin Voivodeship, in eastern Poland.
