= Kolonia Nadwiślańska =

- Village
- Location within Poland
- Coordinates: 51°8′N 21°48′E
- Country: Poland
- Voivodeship: Masovian
- County: Lipsko
- Gmina: Solec nad Wisłą

Kolonia Nadwiślańska [kɔˈlɔɲa nadviˈɕlaɲska] is a village in the administrative district of Gmina Solec nad Wisłą, within Lipsko County, Masovian Voivodeship, in east-central Poland.
