= Sadkowice, Masovian Voivodeship =

Sadkowice
- Village
- Location within Poland
- Coordinates: 51°6′N 21°45′E
- Country: Poland
- Voivodeship: Masovian
- County: Lipsko
- Gmina: Solec nad Wisłą

Population (approx.)
  - Total: 300
- Time zone: UTC+1 (CET)
  - Summer (DST): UTC+2 (CEST)

Sadkowice [satkɔˈvit͡sɛ] is a village in the administrative district of Gmina Solec nad Wisłą, within Lipsko County, Masovian Voivodeship, in east-central Poland.

Eight Polish citizens were murdered by Nazi Germany in the village during World War II.
