= Chruślanki Józefowskie =

- Village
- Location within Poland
- Coordinates: 50°59′N 22°1′E
- Country: Poland
- Voivodeship: Lublin
- County: Opole
- Gmina: Józefów nad Wisłą

Chruślanki Józefowskie (Polish pronunciation: [xruˈɕlankʲi juzɛˈfɔfskʲɛ]) is a village in the administrative district of Gmina Józefów nad Wisłą, within Opole County, Lublin Voivodeship, in eastern Poland.
