= Marianów, Gmina Solec nad Wisłą =

Marianów
- Village
- Location within Poland
- Coordinates: 51°4′21″N 21°46′53″E
- Country: Poland
- Voivodeship: Masovian
- County: Lipsko
- Gmina: Solec nad Wisłą
- Population: 50

Marianów [maˈrjanuf] is a village in the administrative district of Gmina Solec nad Wisłą, within Lipsko County, Masovian Voivodeship, in east-central Poland.
