= Niesiołowice, Lublin Voivodeship =

Niesiołowice
- Village
- Location within Poland
- Coordinates: 51°2′39″N 21°55′37″E
- Country: Poland
- Voivodeship: Lublin
- County: Opole
- Gmina: Józefów nad Wisłą

Niesiołowice [ɲɛɕɔwɔˈvit͡sɛ] is a village in the administrative district of Gmina Józefów nad Wisłą, within Opole County, Lublin Voivodeship, in eastern Poland.
