= Gmina Solec nad Wisłą =

Gmina Solec nad Wisłą Solec nad Wisłą Commune
- Gmina
- Flag Coat of arms
- Interactive map of Gmina Solec nad Wisłą
- Coordinates (Solec nad Wisłą): 51°8′2″N 21°45′47″E
- Country: Poland
- Voivodeship: Masovian
- County: Lipsko
- Seat: Solec nad Wisłą

Area
  - Total: 137.41 km^{2} (53.05 sq mi)

Population (2006)
  - Total: 5,633
  - Density: 40.99/km^{2} (106.2/sq mi)
- Website: http://www.solec.pl/

Gmina Solec nad Wisłą is a rural gmina (administrative district) in Lipsko County, Masovian Voivodeship, in east-central Poland. Its seat is the village of Solec nad Wisłą, which lies approximately 8 kilometres (5 mi) east of Lipsko and 132 km (82 mi) south-east of Warsaw.

The gmina covers an area of 137.41 square kilometres (53.1 sq mi), and as of 2006 its total population is 5,633.

== Villages ==
Gmina Solec nad Wisłą contains the villages and settlements of Boiska, Boiska-Kolonia, Dziurków, Glina, Kalinówek, Kłudzie, Kolonia Nadwiślańska, Las Gliniański, Marianów, Pawłowice, Przedmieście Bliższe, Przedmieście Dalsze, Raj, Sadkowice, Słuszczyn, Solec nad Wisłą, Wola Pawłowska, Zemborzyn Drugi, Zemborzyn Pierwszy and Zemborzyn-Kolonia. Until 2005 it also included Kępa Gostecka and Kępa Solecka, which are now in Gmina Łaziska in Lublin Voivodeship.

== Neighbouring gminas ==
Gmina Solec nad Wisłą is bordered by the gminas of Chotcza, Józefów nad Wisłą, Łaziska, Lipsko and Tarłów.
