= Gmina Tarłów =

Gmina Tarłów Tarłów Commune
- Gmina
- Coat of arms
- Interactive map of Gmina Tarłów
- Coordinates (Tarłów): 51°0′7″N 21°42′52″E
- Country: Poland
- Voivodeship: Świętokrzyskie
- County: Opatów
- Seat: Tarłów

Area
  - Total: 163.77 km^{2} (63.23 sq mi)

Population (2006)
  - Total: 5,753
  - Density: 35.13/km^{2} (90.98/sq mi)
- Website: http://www.tarlow.pl/

Gmina Tarłów is a rural gmina (administrative district) in Opatów County, Świętokrzyskie Voivodeship, in south-central Poland. Its seat is the village of Tarłów, which lies approximately 30 kilometres (19 mi) north-east of Opatów and 79 km (49 mi) east of the regional capital Kielce.

The gmina covers an area of 163.77 square kilometres (63.2 sq mi), and as of 2006 its total population is 5,753.

== Villages ==
Gmina Tarłów contains the villages and settlements of Bronisławów, Brzozowa, Cegielnia, Ciszyca Dolna, Ciszyca Górna, Ciszyca Przewozowa, Ciszyca-Kolonia, Czekarzewice Drugie, Czekarzewice Pierwsze, Dąbrówka, Dorotka, Duranów, Hermanów, Jadwigów, Janów, Julianów, Kolonia Dąbrówka, Kozłówek, Leopoldów, Leśne Chałupy, Łubowa, Maksymów, Mieczysławów, Ostrów, Potoczek, Słupia Nadbrzeżna, Słupia Nadbrzeżna-Kolonia, Sulejów, Tadeuszów, Tarłów, Teofilów, Tomaszów, Wesołówka, Wólka Lipowa, Wólka Tarłowska and Zemborzyn Kościelny.

== Neighbouring gminas ==
Gmina Tarłów is bordered by the gminas of Annopol, Bałtów, Ćmielów, Józefów nad Wisłą, Lipsko, Ożarów, Sienno and Solec nad Wisłą.
