= Stasin, Gmina Józefów nad Wisłą =

Stasin
- Village
- Location within Poland
- Coordinates: 50°58′18″N 21°54′06″E
- Country: Poland
- Voivodeship: Lublin
- County: Opole
- Gmina: Józefów nad Wisłą
- Population (approx.): 70

Stasin [ˈstaɕin] is a village in the administrative district of Gmina Józefów nad Wisłą, within Opole County, Lublin Voivodeship, in eastern Poland.
