= Stare Kaliszany =

- Village
- Location within Poland
- Coordinates: 51°04′12″N 21°48′42″E
- Country: Poland
- Voivodeship: Lublin
- County: Opole
- Gmina: Józefów nad Wisłą

Stare Kaliszany [ˈstarɛ kaliˈʂanɨ] is a village in the administrative district of Gmina Józefów nad Wisłą, within Opole County, Lublin Voivodeship, in eastern Poland.
