= Dziurków =

- Village
- Location within Poland
- Coordinates: 51°9′N 21°43′E
- Country: Poland
- Voivodeship: Masovian
- County: Lipsko
- Gmina: Solec nad Wisłą

Dziurków [ˈd͡ʑurkuf] is a village in the administrative district of Gmina Solec nad Wisłą, within Lipsko County, Masovian Voivodeship, in east-central Poland.
