= Potoczek, Świętokrzyskie Voivodeship =

Potoczek
- Village
- Location within Poland
- Coordinates: 51°00′22″N 21°41′54″E
- Country: Poland
- Voivodeship: Świętokrzyskie
- County: Opatów
- Gmina: Tarłów
- Population: 250

Potoczek [pɔˈtɔt͡ʂɛk] is a village in the administrative district of Gmina Tarłów, within Opatów County, Świętokrzyskie Voivodeship, in south-central Poland. It lies approximately 2 km (1 mi) west of Tarłów, 30 km (19 mi) north-east of Opatów, and 77 km (48 mi) east of the regional capital Kielce.
