= Prawno =

- Village
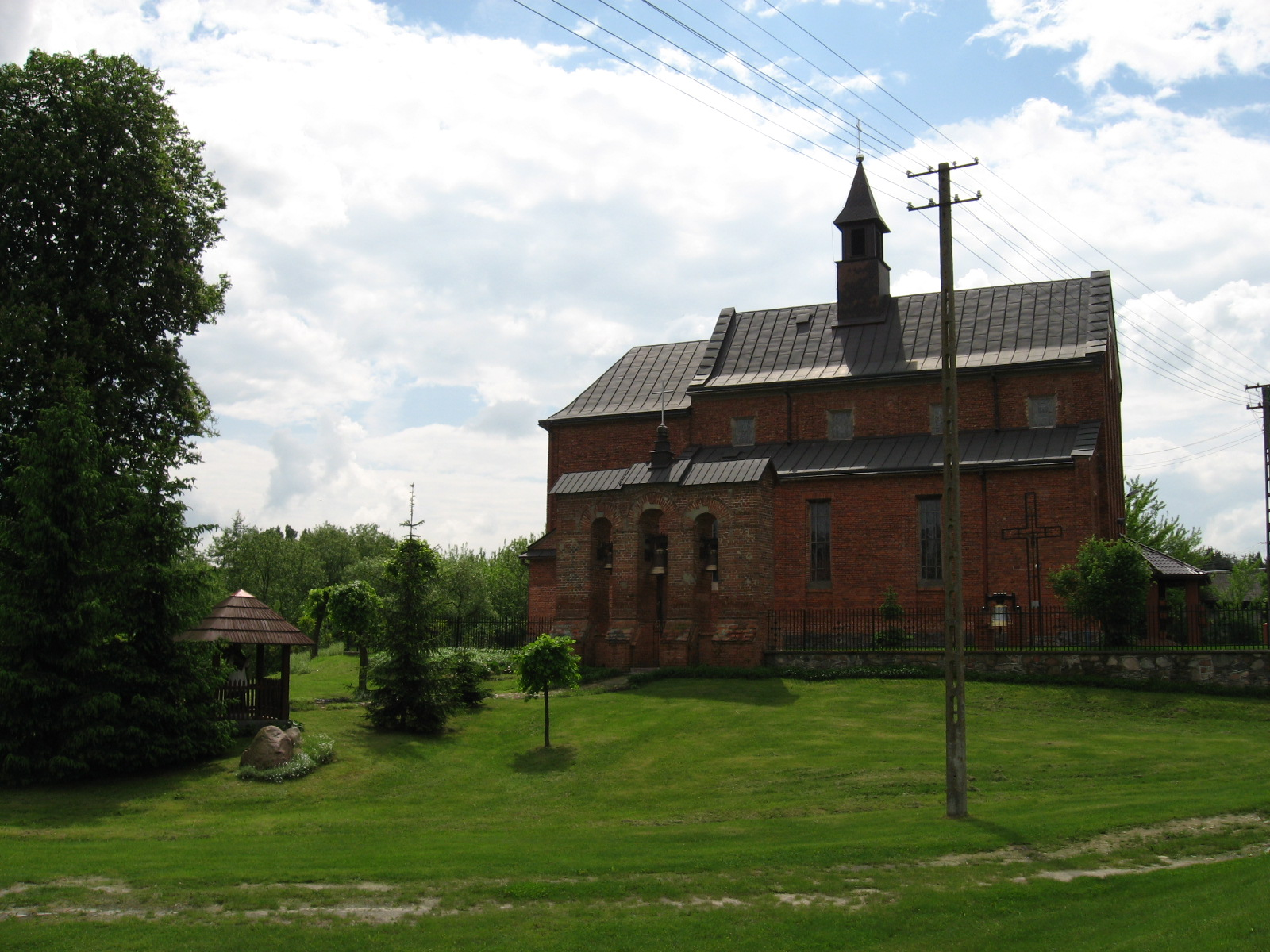
- Saint Anne church in Prawno

- Location within Poland
- Coordinates: 51°0′26″N 21°53′17″E
- Country: Poland
- Voivodeship: Lublin
- County: Opole
- Gmina: Józefów nad Wisłą

Population
  - Total: 180
- Time zone: UTC+1 (CET)
  - Summer (DST): UTC+2 (CEST)

Prawno [ˈpravnɔ] is a village in the administrative district of Gmina Józefów nad Wisłą, within Opole County, Lublin Voivodeship, in eastern Poland.

This is a small and picturesque agricultural village along the Wyznica River. The village's name means "right" or "correct", and is derived from the Polish word for law or right, "prawo". The village's church, the Roman Catholic Parish of St Anne serves many of the nearby villages (e.g., Mazanów, Mariampol, Boiska, Pielgrzymka, Chuślanki, Miloszówka, Stasin, Graniczna, Pokreśle) and there is a cemetery for Prawno and the communities served by the parish across the main road from the Prawno church. The parish website provides a map showing the villages that it serves, and has many photographs of parish life and the area of Prawno.

Three Polish citizens were murdered by Nazi Germany in the village during World War II.
