= Mariampol, Gmina Józefów nad Wisłą =

Mariampol
- Village
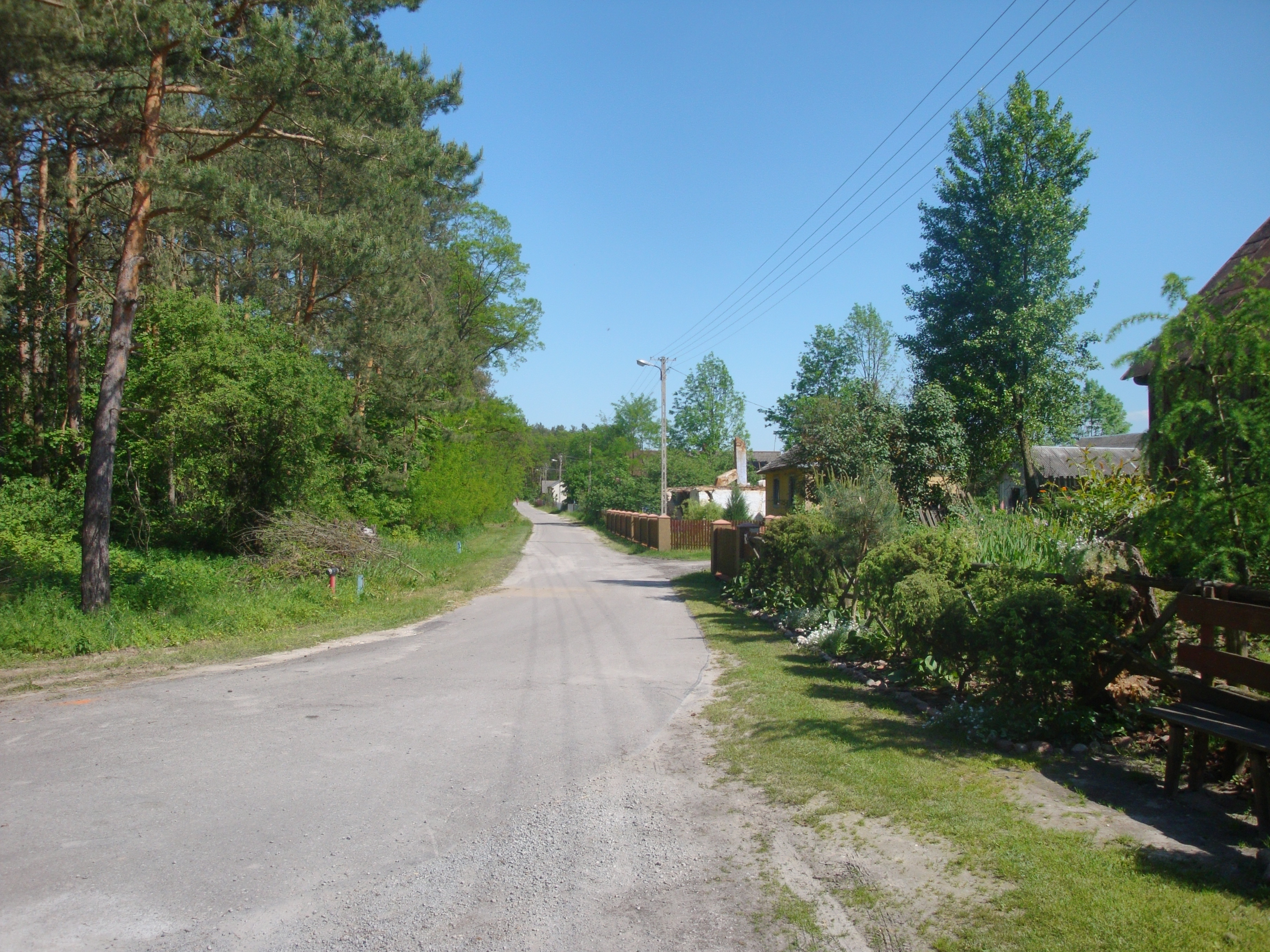

- Location within Poland
- Coordinates: 51°0′39″N 21°52′15″E
- Country: Poland
- Voivodeship: Lublin
- County: Opole
- Gmina: Józefów nad Wisłą

Mariampol [maˈrjampɔl] is a village in the administrative district of Gmina Józefów nad Wisłą, within Opole County, Lublin Voivodeship, in eastern Poland.
