= Maksymów, Świętokrzyskie Voivodeship =

Maksymów
- Village
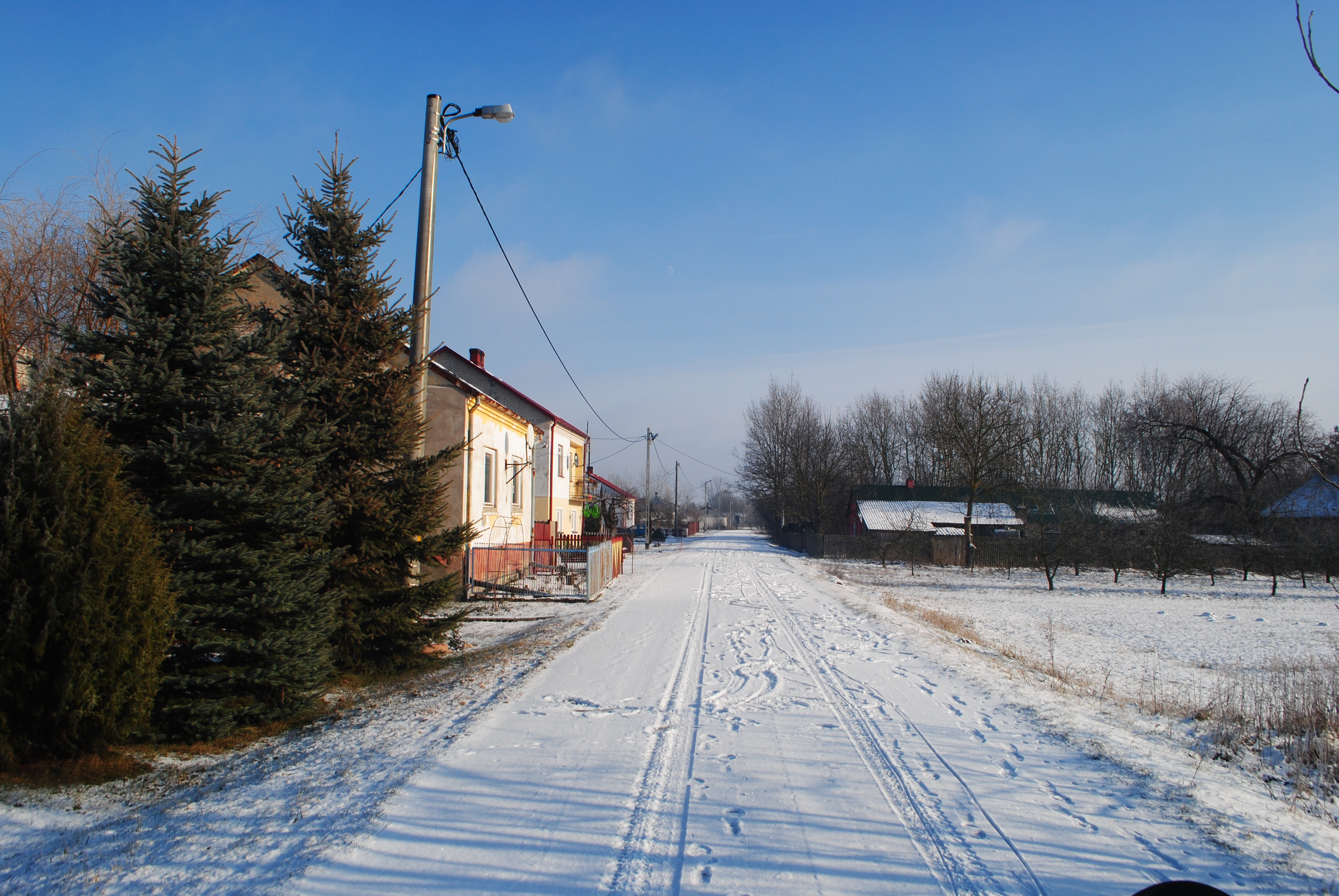

- Location within Poland
- Coordinates: 50°56′19″N 21°46′44″E
- Country: Poland
- Voivodeship: Świętokrzyskie
- County: Opatów
- Gmina: Tarłów
- Population: 80

Maksymów [makˈsɨmuf] is a village in the administrative district of Gmina Tarłów, within Opatów County, Świętokrzyskie Voivodeship, in south-central Poland. It lies approximately 9 km (6 mi) south-east of Tarłów, 29 km (18 mi) north-east of Opatów, and 82 km (51 mi) east of the regional capital Kielce.
