= Dębniak, Gmina Józefów nad Wisłą =

Dębniak
- Village
- Location within Poland
- Coordinates: 50°59′21″N 21°52′14″E
- Country: Poland
- Voivodeship: Lublin
- County: Opole
- Gmina: Józefów nad Wisłą
- Population: 60

Dębniak [ˈdɛmbɲak] is a village in the administrative district of Gmina Józefów nad Wisłą, within Opole County, Lublin Voivodeship, in eastern Poland.
