= Raj, Masovian Voivodeship =

Raj
- Village
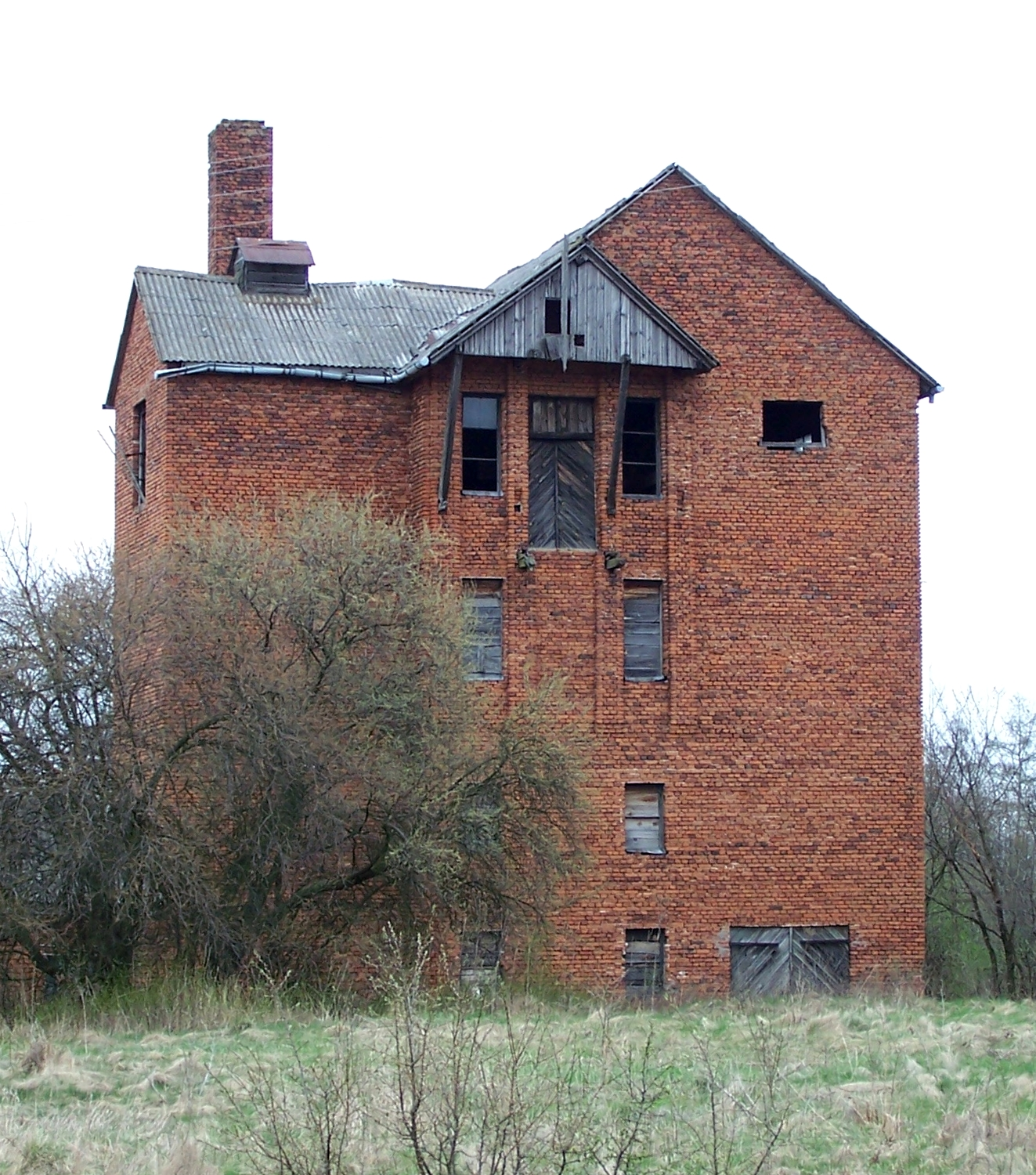

- Location within Poland
- Coordinates: 51°07′17″N 21°45′32″E
- Country: Poland
- Voivodeship: Masovian
- County: Lipsko
- Gmina: Solec nad Wisłą

Raj [rai̯] is a village in the administrative district of Gmina Solec nad Wisłą, within Lipsko County, Masovian Voivodeship, in east-central Poland.
