= Wałowice-Kolonia =

- Village
- Location within Poland
- Coordinates: 50°59′02″N 21°49′49″E
- Country: Poland
- Voivodeship: Lublin
- County: Opole
- Gmina: Józefów nad Wisłą
- Population (approx.): 50

Wałowice-Kolonia [vawɔˈvit͡sɛ kɔˈlɔɲa] is a village in the administrative district of Gmina Józefów nad Wisłą, within Opole County, Lublin Voivodeship, in eastern Poland.
