= Idalin, Lublin Voivodeship =

Idalin
- Village
- Location within Poland
- Coordinates: 51°1′N 22°0′E
- Country: Poland
- Voivodeship: Lublin
- County: Opole
- Gmina: Józefów nad Wisłą

Idalin [iˈdalin] is a village in the administrative district of Gmina Józefów nad Wisłą, within Opole County, Lublin Voivodeship, in eastern Poland.
