= Bór, Gmina Józefów nad Wisłą =

Bór
- Village
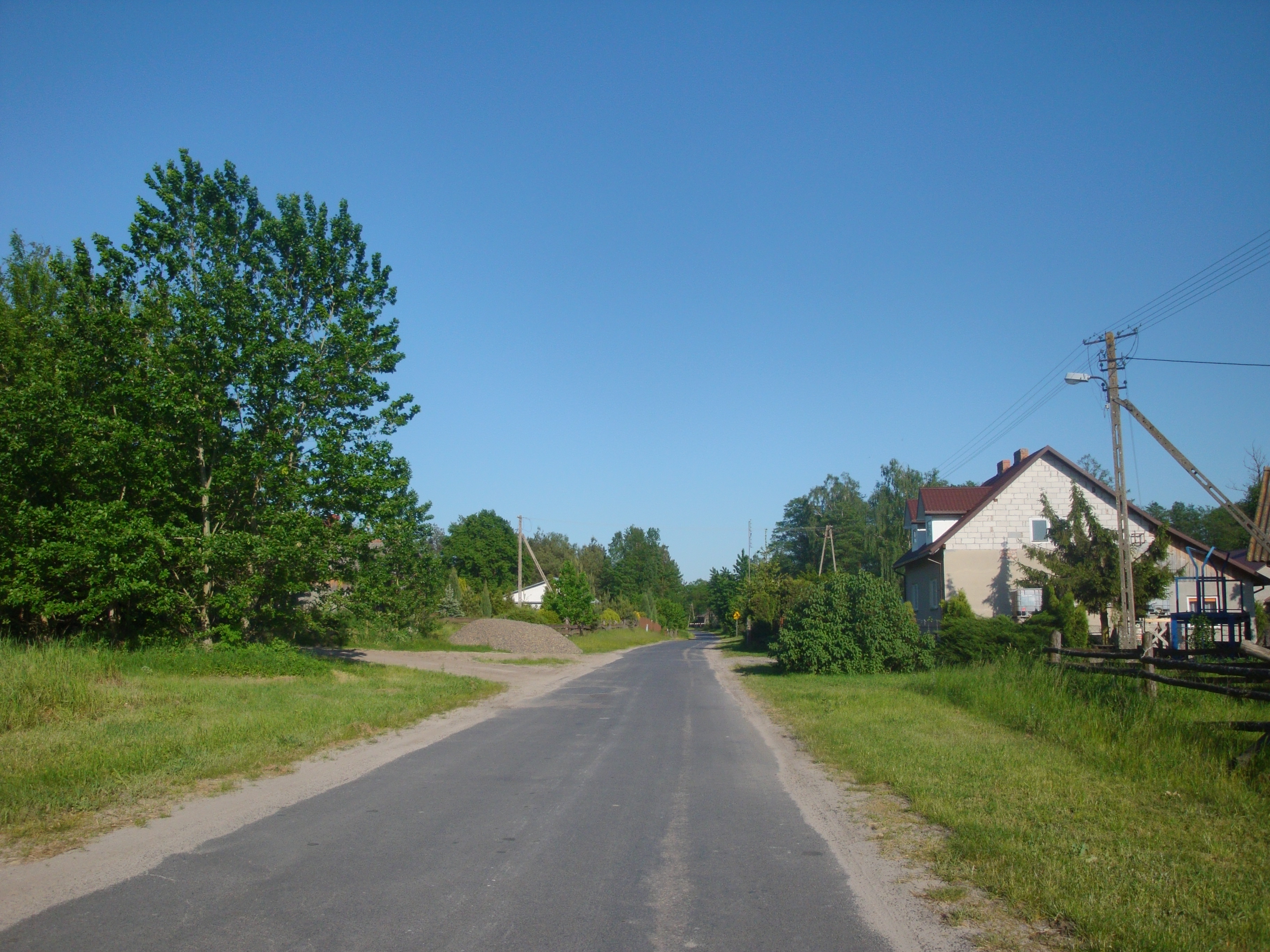

- Location within Poland
- Coordinates: 51°1′N 21°51′E
- Country: Poland
- Voivodeship: Lublin
- County: Opole
- Gmina: Józefów nad Wisłą
- Population: 164

Bór [bur] is a village in the administrative district of Gmina Józefów nad Wisłą, within Opole County, Lublin Voivodeship, in eastern Poland.
