= Przedmieście Dalsze =

- Village
- Location within Poland
- Coordinates: 51°9′N 21°42′E
- Country: Poland
- Voivodeship: Masovian
- County: Lipsko
- Gmina: Solec nad Wisłą
- Population: 900

Przedmieście Dalsze [pʂɛdˈmjɛɕt͡ɕɛ ˈdalʂɛ] is a village in the administrative district of Gmina Solec nad Wisłą, within Lipsko County, Masovian Voivodeship, in east-central Poland.
