= Przedmieście Bliższe =

- Village
- Location within Poland
- Coordinates: 51°8′N 21°44′E
- Country: Poland
- Voivodeship: Masovian
- County: Lipsko
- Gmina: Solec nad Wisłą
- Population: 260

Przedmieście Bliższe [pʂɛdˈmjɛɕt͡ɕɛ ˈbliʂʂɛ] is a village in the administrative district of Gmina Solec nad Wisłą, within Lipsko County, Masovian Voivodeship, in east-central Poland.
