= Miłoszówka =

- Village
- Location within Poland
- Coordinates: 50°57′42″N 21°55′13″E
- Country: Poland
- Voivodeship: Lublin
- County: Opole
- Gmina: Józefów nad Wisłą

Miłoszówka [miwɔˈʂufka] is a village in the administrative district of Gmina Józefów nad Wisłą, within Opole County, Lublin Voivodeship, in eastern Poland.
