= Czekarzewice Pierwsze =

- Village
- Location within Poland
- Coordinates: 51°2′16″N 21°41′31″E
- Country: Poland
- Voivodeship: Świętokrzyskie
- County: Opatów
- Gmina: Tarłów
- Population: 440

Czekarzewice Pierwsze [t͡ʂɛkaʐɛˈvit͡sɛ ˈpjɛrfʂɛ] is a village in the administrative district of Gmina Tarłów, within Opatów County, Świętokrzyskie Voivodeship, in south-central Poland. It lies approximately 5 km (3 mi) north of Tarłów, 32 km (20 mi) north-east of Opatów, and 78 km (48 mi) east of the regional capital Kielce.
