= Łopoczno =

- Village
- Location within Poland
- Coordinates: 51°4′N 21°50′E
- Country: Poland
- Voivodeship: Lublin
- County: Opole
- Gmina: Józefów nad Wisłą

Łopoczno [wɔˈpɔt͡ʂnɔ] is a village in the administrative district of Gmina Józefów nad Wisłą, within Opole County, Lublin Voivodeship, in eastern Poland.
