= Owczarnia, Gmina Józefów nad Wisłą =

Owczarnia
- Village
- Location within Poland
- Coordinates: 51°1′42″N 21°58′12″E
- Country: Poland
- Voivodeship: Lublin
- County: Opole
- Gmina: Józefów nad Wisłą

Owczarnia [ɔfˈt͡ʂarɲa] is a village in the administrative district of Gmina Józefów nad Wisłą, within Opole County, Lublin Voivodeship, in eastern Poland.
