= Kozłówek, Świętokrzyskie Voivodeship =

Kozłówek
- Village
- Location within Poland
- Coordinates: 50°58′29″N 21°41′37″E
- Country: Poland
- Voivodeship: Świętokrzyskie
- County: Opatów
- Gmina: Tarłów
- Population: 360

Kozłówek [kɔˈzwuvɛk] is a village in the administrative district of Gmina Tarłów, within Opatów County, Świętokrzyskie Voivodeship, in south-central Poland. It lies approximately 4 km (2 mi) south-west of Tarłów, 27 km (17 mi) north-east of Opatów, and 77 km (48 mi) east of the regional capital Kielce.
