= Nietrzeba =

{{Infobox settlement | name = Nietrzeba | type = Village | total_type = | image_flag = | image_shield = | image_map = | subdivision_type = Country | subdivision_name = Poland | subdivision_type1 = Voivodeship | subdivision_name1 = Lublin | subdivision_type2 = County

| subdivision_name2 = [[Opole Lubelskie County

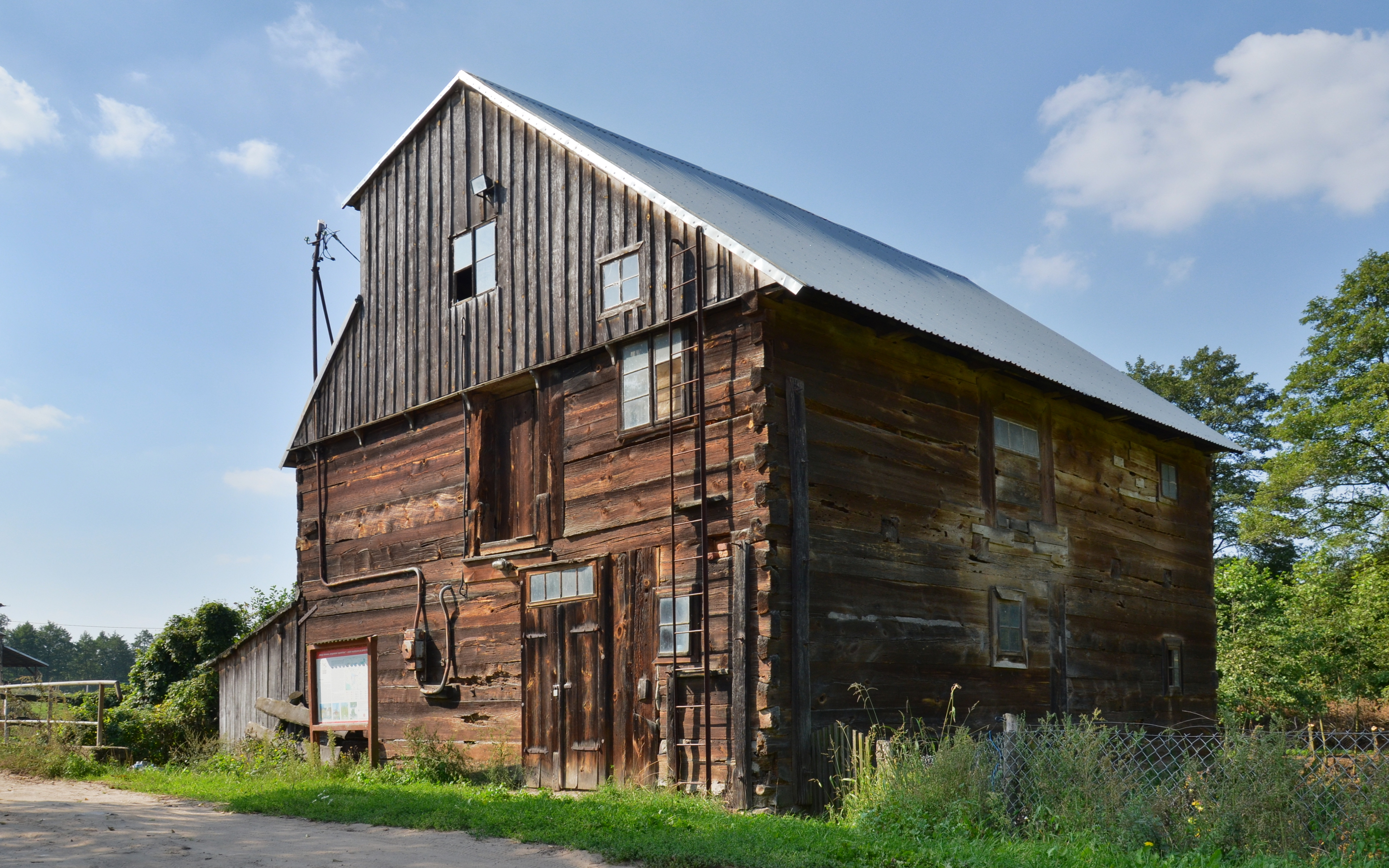
Watermill in Nietrzeba

| Opole Lubelskie]] | subdivision_type3 = Gmina | subdivision_name3 = Józefów nad Wisłą | pushpin_map = Poland | coordinates = 51°3′N 21°54′E | elevation_m = | population_total = | website = }} Nietrzeba [ɲɛˈtʂɛba] is a village in the administrative district of Gmina Józefów nad Wisłą, within Opole County, Lublin Voivodeship, in eastern Poland.
