= Sulejów, Świętokrzyskie Voivodeship =

Sulejów
- Village
- Location within Poland
- Coordinates: 50°59′1″N 21°47′38″E
- Country: Poland
- Voivodeship: Świętokrzyskie
- County: Opatów
- Gmina: Tarłów
- Population: 150

Sulejów [suˈlɛjuf] is a village in the administrative district of Gmina Tarłów, within Opatów County, Świętokrzyskie Voivodeship, in south-central Poland. It lies approximately 6 km (4 mi) east of Tarłów, 33 km (21 mi) north-east of Opatów, and 84 km (52 mi) east of the regional capital Kielce.
