= Chruślanki Mazanowskie =

- Village
- Location within Poland
- Coordinates: 51°2′N 21°58′E
- Country: Poland
- Voivodeship: Lublin
- County: Opole
- Gmina: Józefów nad Wisłą

Chruślanki Mazanowskie [xruˈɕlanki mazaˈnɔfskʲɛ] is a village in the administrative district of Gmina Józefów nad Wisłą, within Opole County, Lublin Voivodeship, in eastern Poland.
