= Gmina Józefów nad Wisłą =

Gmina Józefów nad Wisłą Józefów nad Wisłą Commune
- Gmina
- Coat of arms
- Interactive map of Gmina Józefów nad Wisłą
- Coordinates (Józefów nad Wisłą): 51°2′27″N 21°49′45″E
- Country: Poland
- Voivodeship: Lublin
- County: Opole
- Seat: Józefów nad Wisłą

Area
  - Total: 141.56 km^{2} (54.66 sq mi)

Population (2015)
  - Total: 6,743
  - Density: 47.63/km^{2} (123.4/sq mi)
- Website: http://www.gminajozefow.pl

Gmina Józefów nad Wisłą is an urban-rural gmina (administrative district) in Opole County, Lublin Voivodeship, in eastern Poland. Its seat is the town of Józefów nad Wisłą, which lies approximately 16 kilometres (10 mi) south-west of Opole Lubelskie and 57 km (35 mi) south-west of the regional capital Lublin.

The gmina covers an area of 141.56 square kilometres (54.7 sq mi), and as of 2006 its total population is 6,997 (6,743 in 2015).

== History ==
Prior to the Holocaust, between 800 and 1,000 Jews lived in the town. There were two labor camps established for Jews, located in the synagogue and at the school building. 300 slave laborers worked on construction of embankments in the village of Rybitwy, which culminated in March 1942. From May to October 1941, Polish, Austrian and German Jews worked in slave labor at the school building. On May 9, 1942, the population of Józefów ghetto was sent to Opole Lubelskie, from where they were sent to the death camp at Sobibór.

== Villages ==
Apart from the town of Józefów nad Wisłą, Gmina Józefów nad Wisłą contains the villages and settlements of Basonia, Boiska-Kolonia, Bór, Chruślanki Józefowskie, Chruślanki Mazanowskie, Chruślina, Chruślina-Kolonia, Dębniak, Graniczna, Idalin, Kaliszany-Kolonia, Kolczyn, Łopoczno, Mariampol, Mazanów, Miłoszówka, Niesiołowice, Nieszawa, Nieszawa-Kolonia, Nietrzeba, Owczarnia, Pielgrzymka, Pocześle, Prawno, Rybitwy, Spławy, Stare Boiska, Stare Kaliszany, Stasin, Stefanówka, Studnisko, Ugory, Wałowice, Wałowice-Kolonia and Wólka Kolczyńska.

== Neighbouring gminas ==
Gmina Józefów nad Wisłą is bordered by the gminas of Annopol, Dzierzkowice, Łaziska, Opole Lubelskie, Solec nad Wisłą, Tarłów and Urzędów.
