= Pawłowice, Lipsko County =

Pawłowice
- Village
- Location within Poland
- Coordinates: 51°4′17″N 21°44′48″E
- Country: Poland
- Voivodeship: Masovian
- County: Lipsko
- Gmina: Solec nad Wisłą

Pawłowice [pavwɔˈvit͡sɛ] is a village in the administrative district of Gmina Solec nad Wisłą, within Lipsko County, Masovian Voivodeship, in east-central Poland.
