= Glina, Lipsko County =

Glina
- Village
- Location within Poland
- Coordinates: 51°5′N 21°43′E
- Country: Poland
- Voivodeship: Masovian
- County: Lipsko
- Gmina: Solec nad Wisłą

Glina [ˈɡlina] is a village in the administrative district of Gmina Solec nad Wisłą, within Lipsko County, Masovian Voivodeship, in east-central Poland.
