= Józefów nad Wisłą =

- Town
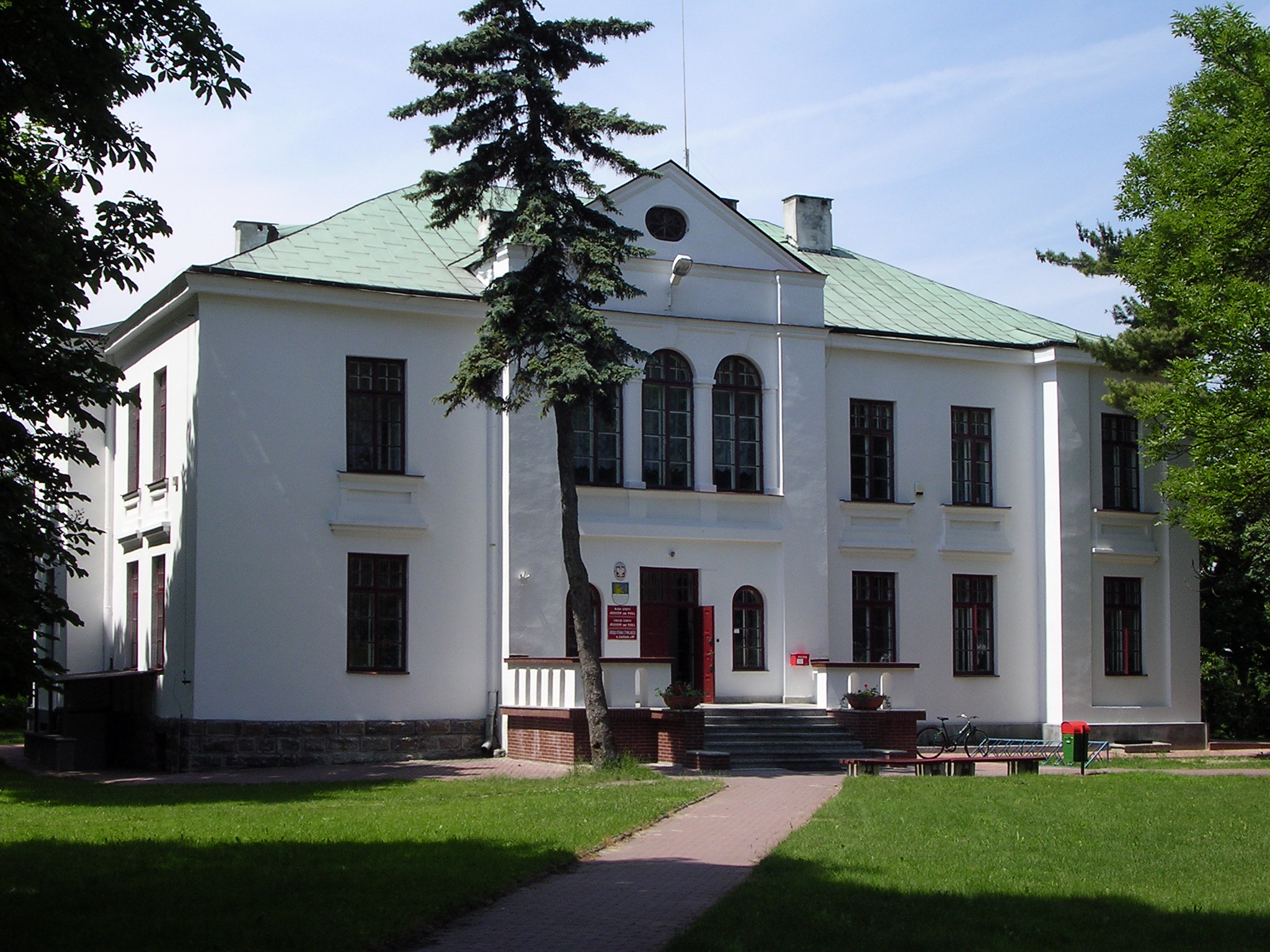
- Palace

- Coat of arms

- Location within Poland
- Coordinates: 51°2′27″N 21°49′45″E
- Country: Poland
- Voivodeship: Lublin
- County: Opole
- Gmina: Józefów nad Wisłą
- Town rights: 1687–1870; 2018

Government
  - Mayor: Paweł Grabek (PiS)

Area
  - Total: 23.92 km^{2} (9.24 sq mi)

Population
  - Total: 1,023
- Postal code: 24-340
- Calling code: +48 81
- Website: www.gminajozefow.pl

Józefów nad Wisłą (Polish pronunciation: [juˈzɛfuf nad ˈviswɔ̃]) is a small town in Opole County, Lublin Voivodeship, in eastern Poland. It is the seat of the gmina (administrative district) called Gmina Józefów nad Wisłą.

Józefów nad Wisłą lies on the Vistula river.

The town has a population of 1,023, and in 1687–1870 it had a status of a town, regained in 2018.

== Twin towns ==
Józefów nad Wisłą is twinned with:

- Auce, Latvia
- Hollóháza, Hungary
- Tryńcza, Poland

== Gallery ==
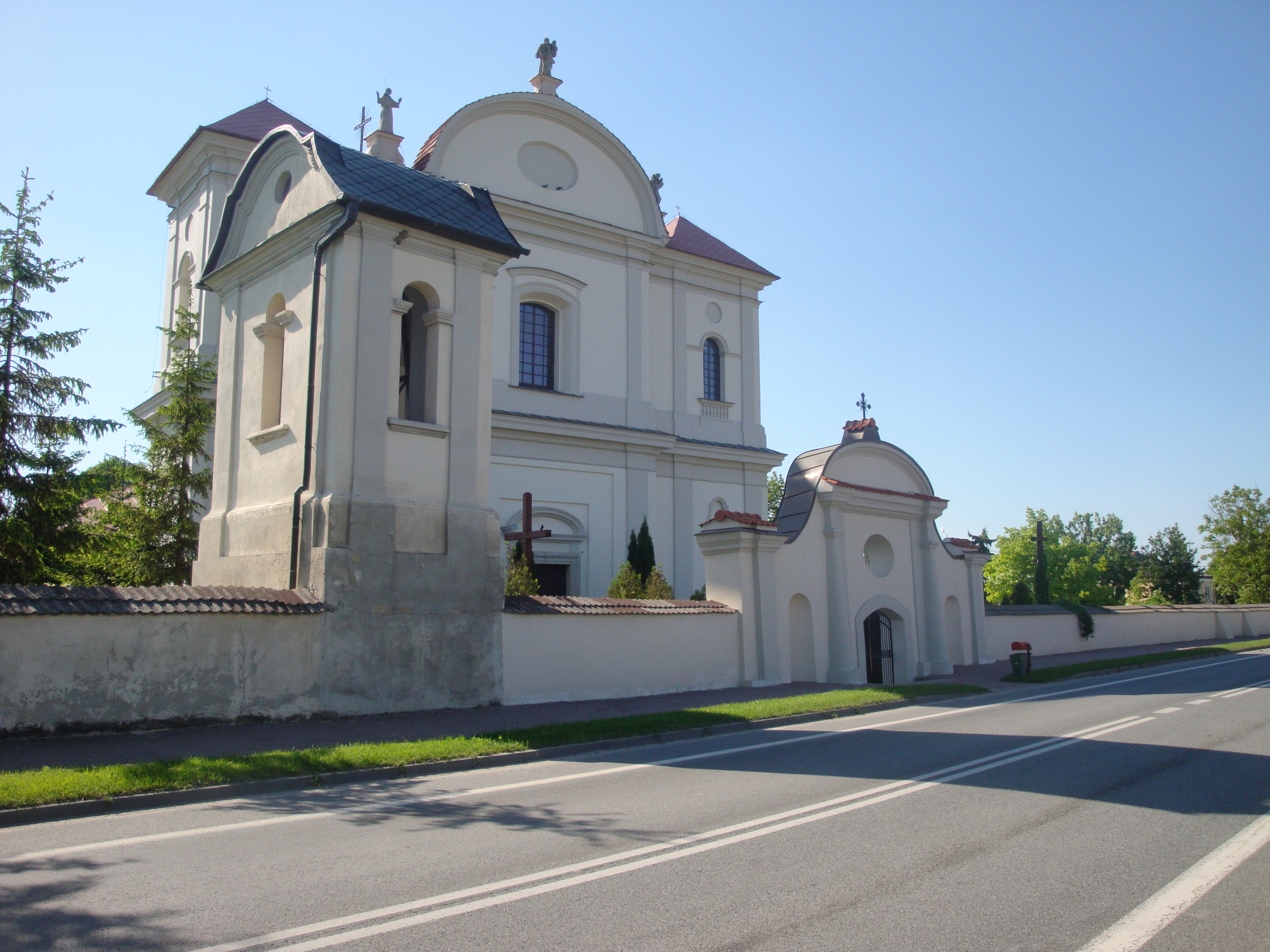
Corpus Christi Church
