= Ugory, Lublin Voivodeship =

Ugory
- Village
- Location within Poland
- Coordinates: 50°58′33″N 21°57′48″E
- Country: Poland
- Voivodeship: Lublin
- County: Opole
- Gmina: Józefów nad Wisłą

Ugory [uˈɡɔrɨ] is a village in the administrative district of Gmina Józefów nad Wisłą, within Opole County, Lublin Voivodeship, in eastern Poland.
