= Czekarzewice Drugie =

- Village
- Location within Poland
- Coordinates: 51°2′1″N 21°40′21″E
- Country: Poland
- Voivodeship: Świętokrzyskie
- County: Opatów
- Gmina: Tarłów
- Population: 440

Czekarzewice Drugie [t͡ʂɛkaʐɛˈvit͡sɛ ˈdruɡʲɛ] is a village in the administrative district of Gmina Tarłów, within Opatów County, Świętokrzyskie Voivodeship, in south-central Poland. It lies approximately 5 km (3 mi) north-west of Tarłów, 31 km (19 mi) north-east of Opatów, and 76 km (47 mi) east of the regional capital Kielce.
