= Las Gliniański =

- Village
- Location within Poland
- Coordinates: 51°05′42″N 21°39′49″E
- Country: Poland
- Voivodeship: Masovian
- County: Lipsko
- Gmina: Solec nad Wisłą
- Population (approx.): 400

Las Gliniański [ˈlas ɡliˈɲaɲski] is a village in the administrative district of Gmina Solec nad Wisłą, within Lipsko County, Masovian Voivodeship, in east-central Poland.
