= Boiska-Kolonia, Masovian Voivodeship =

Boiska-Kolonia
- Village
- Location within Poland
- Coordinates: 51°11′55″N 21°45′27″E
- Country: Poland
- Voivodeship: Masovian
- County: Lipsko
- Gmina: Solec nad Wisłą

Boiska-Kolonia [ˈbɔiska kɔˈlɔɲa] is a village in the administrative district of Gmina Solec nad Wisłą, within Lipsko County, Masovian Voivodeship, in east-central Poland.
