= Spławy, Gmina Józefów nad Wisłą =

Spławy
- Village
- Location within Poland
- Coordinates: 51°2′12″N 21°54′21″E
- Country: Poland
- Voivodeship: Lublin
- County: Opole
- Gmina: Józefów nad Wisłą
- Time zone: UTC+1 (CET)
  - Summer (DST): UTC+2 (CEST)

Spławy [ˈspwavɨ] is a village in the administrative district of Gmina Józefów nad Wisłą, within Opole County, Lublin Voivodeship, in eastern Poland.

== History ==
Four Polish citizens were murdered by Nazi Germany in the village during World War II.
