= Boiska-Kolonia, Lublin Voivodeship =

Settlement in Poland

Boiska-Kolonia
- Colony
- Location within Poland
- Coordinates: 51°0′8″N 21°57′11″E
- Country: Poland
- Voivodeship: Lublin
- County: Opole
- Gmina: Józefów nad Wisłą

Boiska-Kolonia [ˈbɔiska kɔˈlɔɲa] is a colony in the administrative district of Gmina Józefów nad Wisłą, within Opole County, Lublin Voivodeship, in eastern Poland.
