= Zemborzyn Kościelny =

- Village
- Location within Poland
- Coordinates: 51°02′47″N 21°43′53″E
- Country: Poland
- Voivodeship: Świętokrzyskie
- County: Opatów
- Gmina: Tarłów

Zemborzyn Kościelny [zɛmˈbɔʐɨn kɔɕˈt͡ɕɛlnɨ] is a village in the administrative district of Gmina Tarłów, within Opatów County, Świętokrzyskie Voivodeship, in south-central Poland.
