= Zemborzyn Drugi =

- Village
- Location within Poland
- Coordinates: 51°04′12″N 21°41′58″E
- Country: Poland
- Voivodeship: Masovian
- County: Lipsko
- Gmina: Solec nad Wisłą

Zemborzyn Drugi [zɛmˈbɔʐɨn ˈdruɡi] is a village in the administrative district of Gmina Solec nad Wisłą, within Lipsko County, Masovian Voivodeship, in east-central Poland.
