= Pielgrzymka, Lublin Voivodeship =

Pielgrzymka
- Village
- Location within Poland
- Coordinates: 50°59′N 21°55′E
- Country: Poland
- Voivodeship: Lublin
- County: Opole
- Gmina: Józefów nad Wisłą

Population
  - Total: 40
- Time zone: UTC+1 (CET)
  - Summer (DST): UTC+2 (CEST)

Pielgrzymka [pjɛlˈɡʐɨmka] is a village in the administrative district of Gmina Józefów nad Wisłą, within Opole County, Lublin Voivodeship, in eastern Poland.

== History ==
Five Polish citizens were murdered by Nazi Germany in the village during World War II.
