= Zemborzyn-Kolonia =

- Village
- Location within Poland
- Coordinates: 51°3′43″N 21°42′36″E
- Country: Poland
- Voivodeship: Masovian
- County: Lipsko
- Gmina: Solec nad Wisłą

Zemborzyn-Kolonia [zɛmˈbɔʐɨn kɔˈlɔɲa] is a village in the administrative district of Gmina Solec nad Wisłą, within Lipsko County, Masovian Voivodeship, in east-central Poland.
