= Solec nad Wisłą =

- Town
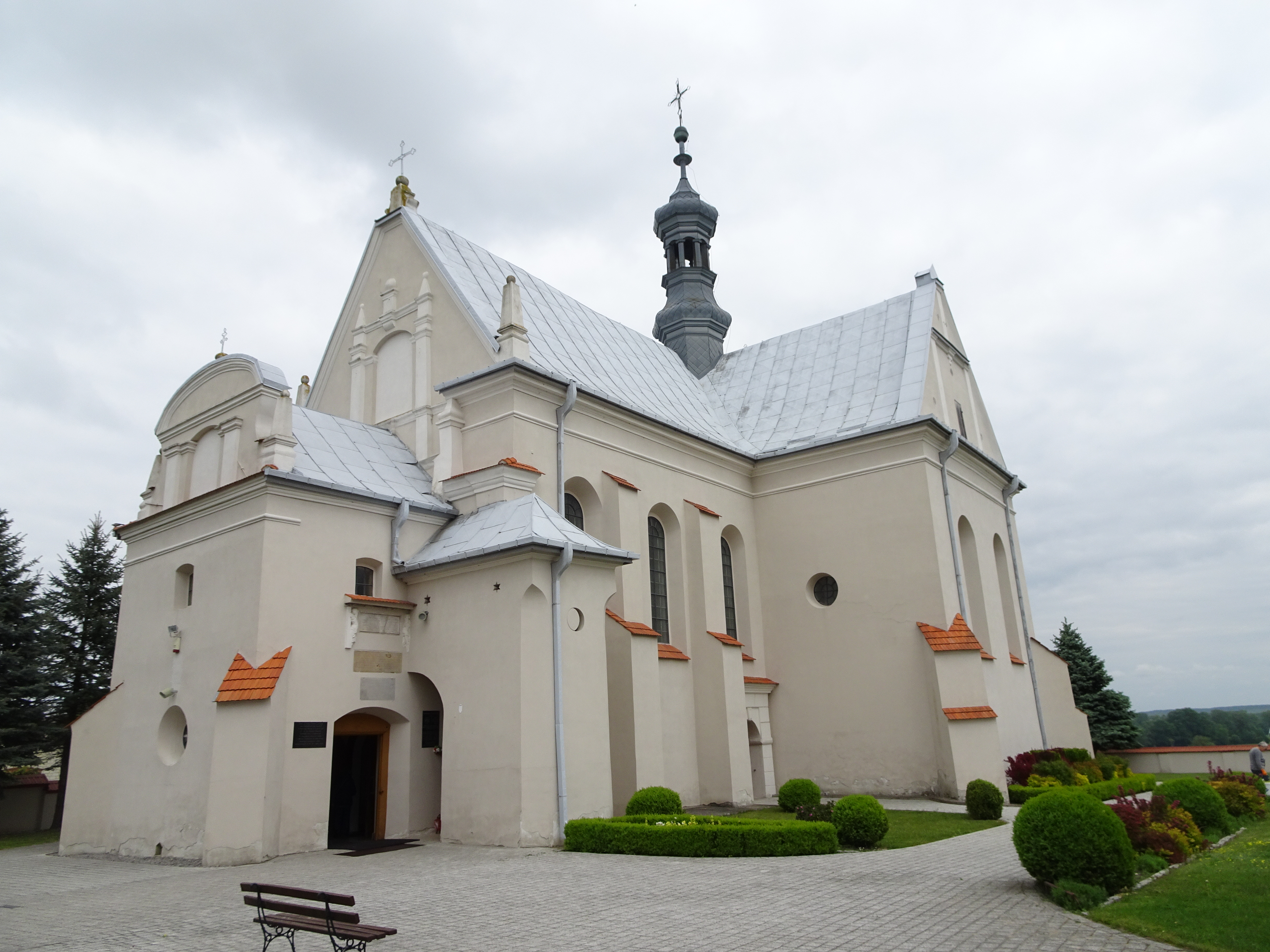
- Gothic-Renaissance Church of the Assumption in Solec nad Wisłą

- Flag Coat of arms

- Location within Poland
- Coordinates: 51°8′2″N 21°45′47″E
- Country: Poland
- Voivodeship: Masovian
- County: Lipsko
- Gmina: Solec nad Wisłą
- First mentioned: 1138
- Town rights: 1347

Population
  - Total: 1,650
- Time zone: UTC+1 (CET)
  - Summer (DST): UTC+2 (CEST)
- Vehicle registration: WLI

Solec nad Wisłą [ˈsɔlɛt͡s ˌnad ˈviswɔ̃] is a town in Lipsko County, Masovian Voivodeship, in east-central Poland. It is the seat of the gmina (administrative district) called Gmina Solec nad Wisłą. The town has a population of 1,650, and is located on the Vistula river, in historic Lesser Poland.

Founded in the medieval period and granted town rights by King Casimir III the Great, Solec nad Wisłą is a former royal town of Poland, which was a regional center for salt trade. Solec maintains the character of a small town, with a traditional market square, a feature of many medieval European towns. Its landmarks are historic churches in Gothic-Renaissance and Baroque styles.

== History ==
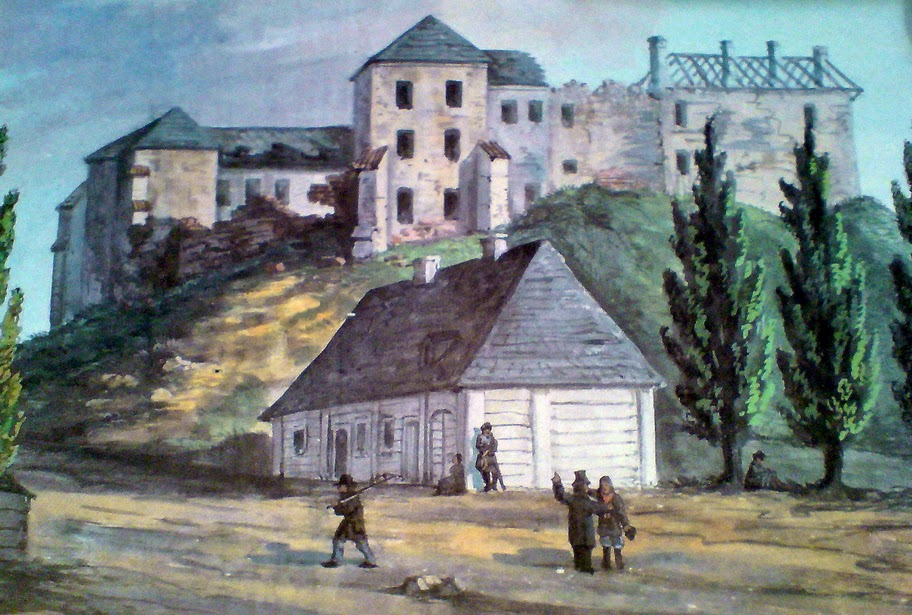
19th-century painting of the medieval castle by Kazimierz Stronczyński

In its early days, Solec used to be called Solca, and the name most probably comes from trading of salt, which took place here. The town was also called Solec Sandomierski and Solec Radomski, and in the 19th century, the name Solec nad Wisłą was accepted, to distinguish it from other places, such as Solec Kujawski.

Solec has a long history, it was first mentioned in 1136 in the Bull of Gniezno, and at that time, it belonged to the Archbishop of Gniezno. In the 12th century the village belonged to the Order of the Holy Sepulchre, and in 1325 it was purchased by King Władysław I the Elbow-high. In 1347 King Casimir the Great granted it Magdeburg rights, building here a castle and renovating a parish church. Solec was a royal town of Poland, administratively located in the Radom County in the Sandomierz Voivodeship in the Lesser Poland Province.

In the 15th and 16th centuries Solec emerged as a local salt trade center. It organized fairs and enjoyed several privileges, confirmed by King Sigismund I the Old. In 1615–1627 Krzysztof Zbaraski rebuilt the castle in Renaissance style and founded a monastery. During the Swedish invasion of Poland (1655–1660) the prosperous town and the castle were completely destroyed - out of 246 houses, only 6 remained after the war. The town began to slowly recover in the 18th century. It was annexed by Austria in the Third Partition of Poland in 1795. In 1809, after the Polish victory in the Austro-Polish War, it was included within the short-lived Polish Duchy of Warsaw, and after its dissolution, in 1815, it passed to Russian-controlled Congress Poland. After the unsuccessful Polish January Uprising Solec was deprived of its town charter (1869), which was restored in 2021. After World War I, in 1918, Poland regained independence and control of the settlement.

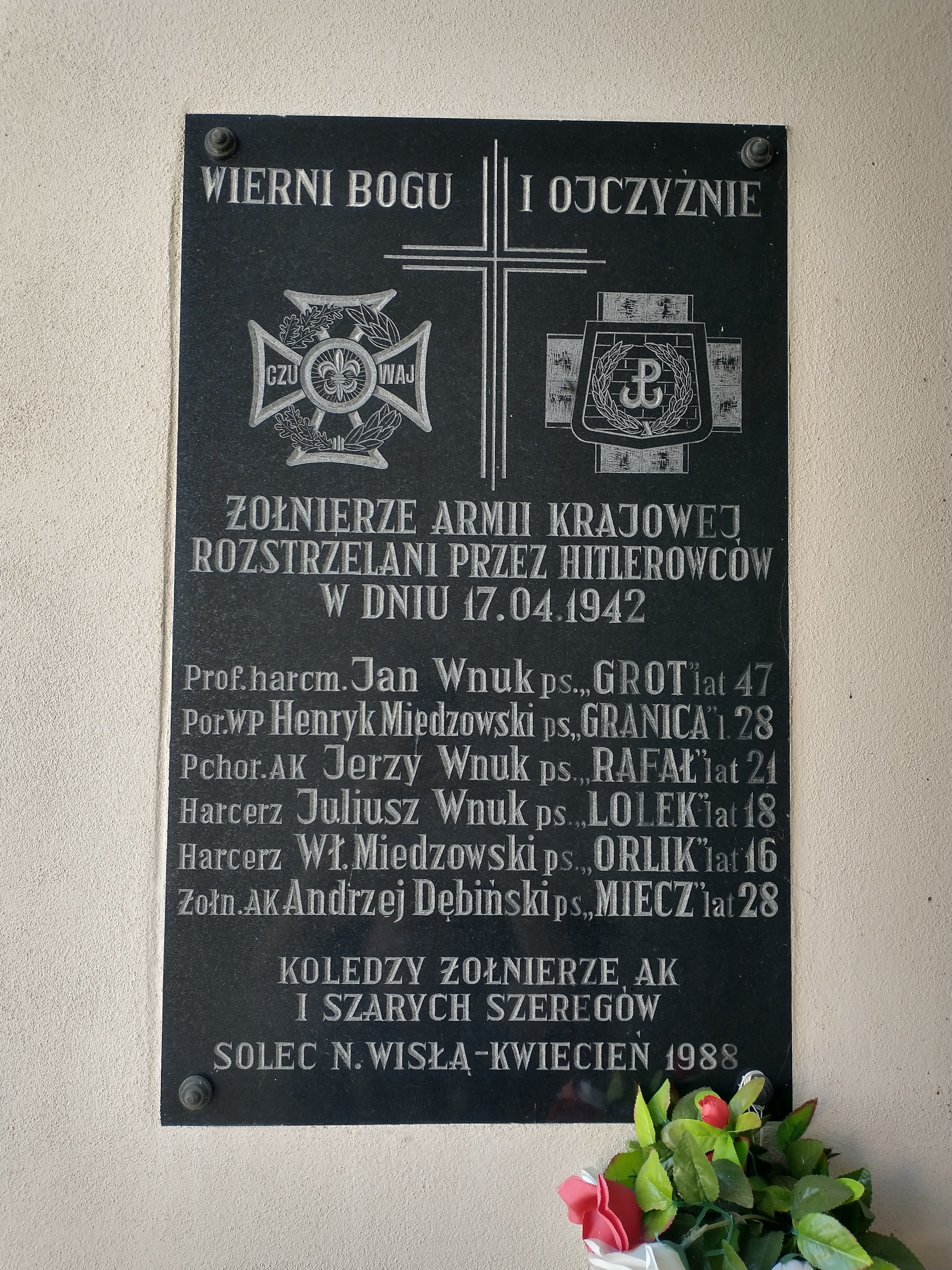
Memorial plaque to local Polish partisans executed by the German occupiers in 1942

Following the German-Soviet invasion of Poland, which started World War II in September 1939, Solec was occupied by Germany until 1945. Over a dozen Poles, who were either born, educated or lived and worked in Solec, were murdered by the Russian in the Katyn massacre in 1940. The Germans established and operated a Baudienst forced labour camp for Poles in Solec. On 28 October 1942, the Peasant Battalions liberated over 300 young Poles from the Baudienst camp.

== Sights ==
Among points of interest there are:

- 14th-century Gothic parish church, remodelled in the 16th and 17th centuries, with a late Renaissance altar,
- complex of former monastery (1624), which has belonged to the state since 1864,
- St. Barbara cemetery with a Baroque cemetery church,
- several roadside chapels, with the oldest one from 1784,
- ruins of a 14th-century castle, which guarded the Vistula crossing. In 1615-1627 the castle was remodelled by Krzysztof Zbaraski, and in 1655 - 1660 it was completely destroyed, together with whole town of Solec,
- 18th-century houses in the market square,
- 19th-century town hall.

== Sports ==
The local football club is Wisła Solec. It competes in the lower leagues.
