= Tarłów =

- Village
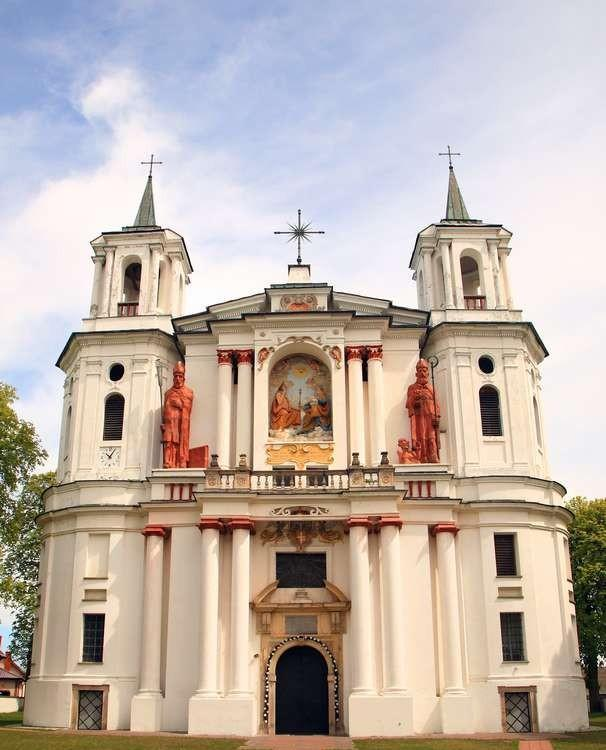
- Baroque Holy Trinity church in Tarłów

- Coat of arms

- Location within Poland
- Coordinates: 51°0′7″N 21°42′52″E
- Country: Poland
- Voivodeship: Świętokrzyskie
- County: Opatów
- Gmina: Tarłów
- Founded: 1550
- Founder: Andrzej Tarło
- Named for: Andrzej Tarło

Population
  - Total: 790
- Time zone: UTC+1 (CET)
  - Summer (DST): UTC+2 (CEST)
- Postal code: 27-515
- Area code: +48 15
- Vehicle registration: TOP
- Website: http://www.tarlow.pl/

Tarłów [ˈtarwuf] is a village (a town in 1550–1870) in Opatów County, Świętokrzyskie Voivodeship, in south-central Poland. It is the seat of the gmina (administrative district) called Gmina Tarłów. It lies approximately 30 km (19 mi) north-east of Opatów and 79 km (49 mi) east of the regional capital Kielce. It is approximately 13 km (8 mi) north of the town of Ożarów. The village belongs to historic province of Lesser Poland.

== History ==
The history of Tarłów dates back to 1550, when a local nobleman, Andrzej Tarło, founded the town named after himself, which replaced the already existing village of Czekarzewice. Tarłów received its charter in 1550 from King Sigismund II Augustus, in Piotrków Trybunalski. The town's inhabitants, thanks to the King's order, were exempt from paying taxes for 20 years. In 1614 Tarłów got its first, wooden church, founded by Mikołaj Oleśnicki. In 1636 a hospital was opened, and in 1647, the wooden church was replaced with a brick church of Holy Trinity, which still stands. During the Deluge, Swedish invaders destroyed and ransacked most of Lesser Poland's towns, including Tarłów. After the wars, the town never recovered.

The town was annexed by Austria in the Third Partition of Poland in 1795. After the Polish victory in the Austro-Polish War of 1809, it became part of the short-lived Duchy of Warsaw, and after the duchy's dissolution in 1815, it passed to Russian-controlled Congress Poland. In 1851, Tarłów almost completely burned - all that remained were four houses and the church. During the January Uprising Tarłów was one of the centers of the rebellion, for which in 1869 the Russians stripped it of the town rights. In 1873, a pandemic of cholera decimated the population, including local artisans, famous for their pots. In 1877 Tarłów got a courthouse of the gmina, and in 1905 - first fire station.

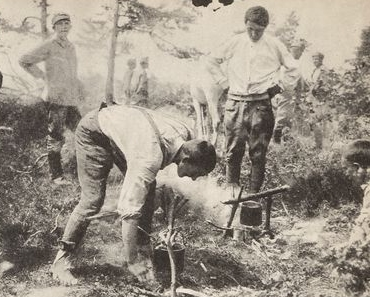
Polish legionnaires in Tarłów during World War I

In 1915, during World War I, 1st Brigade, Polish Legions fought here with Russian troops. In 1927, the government of the Second Polish Republic opened here an elementary school, in a complex which is still used.

During the German occupation of Poland in World War II, Tarłów's Jewish population was murdered in the Holocaust. In 1943, the Home Army company Tarłów was created, which in the summer 1944 took part in the Operation Tempest.

=== History of the Jewish community ===
==== Famous rabbis ====
Jacob Joshua Falk (1680-1756) the famous Talmudist and author of the Pene Yehoshua was Rabbi in Tarłów for a time.

Rabbi Yehudah Yudel Rosenberg (1859-1935) was rabbi in Tarłów from 1885 to 1889 or 1890 (he had married a woman from Tarłów in 1877) and became known in Poland as Rav Yudel Tarlow'er.

A prolific author, Rabbi Rosenberg assumed a number of positions in Poland, before moving to Toronto, Canada, where he became rabbi of Beth Jacob, a Polish Jewish congregation that was established in 1897. There he founded the Eitz Chaim school (which still exists today), before moving to Montreal in 1919, where he served as one of its most prominent rabbis, until 1935, when he died at the age of seventy-five. Scholars believe that many of the stories told today about the Golem of Prague (attributed to the Maharal of Prague - Judah Loew ben Bezalel) were in fact first authored by Rabbi Yudel Rosenberg.

Canadian author Mordecai Richler from Montreal (and a grandson of Rabbi Rosenberg) and Canadian religious leader Eli Rubenstein from Toronto (whose grandfather was born in Tarlow), have roots in the town.

==== Fate of Tarłów's Jewish population ====
After World War I, about 1,000 Jews lived in Tarłów, roughly half of the small town's population. They worked in crafts and small-time trade - some farmed small plots of land near their homes. Most of its Jewish population was traditional (Orthodox) with a smaller percentage identifying with Zionism.

In September 1939, the Germans occupied Tarłów. They established a Judenrat, and forced them to collect large sums of money in ransoms, and also gathered Jewish residents for forced labor.

The ghetto in Tarłów was set up in December 1941. In June 1942, seventy young Jews were sent from the ghetto to the Skarżysko-Kamienna labor camp. A few months later, the Germans brought Jews from nearby towns to the Tarłów ghetto, and the ghetto population swelled to approximately 7,000 people.

On October 29, 1942, the majority of ghetto inhabitants were deported to Treblinka. During the deportation, more than 100 Jews were murdered in Tarłów, the rest were sent to Treblinka where they were all murdered immediately. Afterwards, dozens who were found hiding were executed in a mass grave at the Jewish cemetery in Tarłów.

Today there is not a single Jew left in Tarłów or even within miles of the town. Not far from the centre, the town's former synagogue (built in 1786) lies in ruins, overrun with bushes and trees.

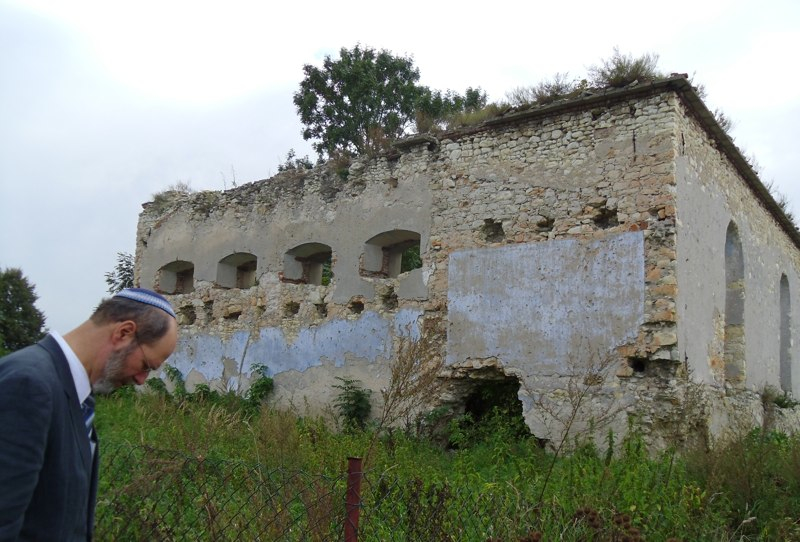
Ruins of Tarłów Synagogue. Foreground: Eli Rubenstein. His grandfather, Nechemia, immigrated from Tarłów to Toronto, Canada in 1913.

==== Cemetery restoration ====
In the fall of 2011, the Jewish cemetery in Tarłów, which had laid in ruins since the Holocaust, was rededicated in a ceremony attended by Jewish people from around the world with roots in Tarłów, along with the town's residents. The initiative to restore the cemetery had begun a decade earlier, with the efforts of a local Polish citizen, Dr. Jan Curylo, who had organized the cemetery reclamation effort.

The inscription at the newly restored cemetery reads:

"In memory of the righteous Jews of Tarlow, those brutally murdered during the war, whose graves will forever be unknown, and those whose graves were desecrated here - at the hands of the soulless Nazi murderers.

May the descendants of Tarlow's Jews honor their memory through the observance of Torah and Mitzvot and by creating peace in the world.

This cemetery has been restored by North American Jews with roots in Tarlow and the surrounding region."

== "Without the Right to Life" (2022) A Documentary ==
"Without the Right to Life" was written and directed by retired SW Major Waldemar Kowalski. Professor Grzegorz Berendt, Director of the Museum of the Second World War in Gdansk, with roots in Tarlow, served as the historical consultant for the film.

The Museum of the Second World War in Gdańsk (Muzeum II Wojny Światowej w Gdańsku) produced the documentary with footage prepared by the regional TV station about Tarłów, specifically made to help restore the memories of approximately 7,000 Jews who were gathered and sent from the Tarlow ghetto to Treblinka on October 19, 1942, to be exterminated. The opening of this documentary states that there are well-known places typically mentioned when talking about the Holocaust. However, the tragic events of the Holocaust took place in many lesser-known locations as well. One of them is Tarłów.

The film was produced to mark 80 years since Operation Reinhardt. The code name of what was then, a secret German plan in World War II to exterminate Polish Jews in German-occupied Poland. On that same day, 80 years later (October 19, 2022), the film was premiered in Gdańsk at the Muzeum II Wojny Światowej w Gdańsku. Three days later, the ceremonial screening was organized at the Cultural Center in the village of Tarłów.

The mayor of Tarłów municipality, Mr. Tomasz Kamiński, also expressed his appreciation. He stressed that "thanks to the film, the stories of his grandparents and other elders from the village, which he had heard since his youth, were revived in him." He also thanked the filmmakers for taking part the film's topic and the witnesses who had the courage to step in front of the camera and speak about these events." These witnesses are: Anna Kołsut, Lucyna Medyńska, Zygmunt Sitarski, Józef Janowski, Jan Wieczerzak, Marek Soczewiński, Dr. Wawrzyniec Sadkowski.

The movie depicts the Polish-Jewish community of Tarłów, both before the war and during the establishment of the ghetto. It also portrays the relocation of Jews from other towns to this ghetto. The film uses witness accounts, rare photographs, and archival documents to recount the events. Additionally, historians and researchers offer their expertise on the subject matter.

Elderly villagers of Tarłów depict a community of amicable residents during the interwar period. Stories of Polish and Jewish children playing together, teenagers falling in love, and Jewish craftsman, merchants, and service providers (tailors, shoemakers, and various forms of services), all working from one house to the next, trading and bartering for food and other items. Another witness account spoke about her mother's generosity with large plates of meals for their children's friends.

In the fall of 1939 in Tarłów, all stores, craft workshops and other businesses or companies had to be officially registered and Germany imposed a ban on social, cultural and political life for Jewish people. Witness testimony commented how a person who, just a few months prior, was a citizen of a large state with rights, was suddenly an outsider left vulnerable to any type of cruel treatment. Property was confiscated and the Jews lost all access to social welfare and medical care.

Archived documents were shown in the film. One in particular was from a report of a Jewish self-help society in Tarłów, to the Jewish community, headquartered in Krakow:

"April 1, 1941. The city is exhausted materially to the point of extinction. The dispatched and the poor don’t have a shirt to change into. The consequences of this are dire – infectious diseases spreading. It is frightening to see people walking around barefoot and shabby.”

When the ghetto was established by the German authorities, the Jewish inhabitants of Tarlow and the surrounding villages were ordered to move to an already overcrowded part of the village that housed important Jewish institutions like the synagogue and the mikvah. By June 1941, the Jews were not allowed to leave the designated area, and the Tarlow ghetto became a closed ghetto.

Another elder's resident testimony remembers fishing with friends while witnessing a small group of Germans executing 6 Jewish women in a small field. The culmination of testimony all state that Tarlow was a place of terror and violence, with examples of forced labor, Particularly the phosphate mines. A document is shown in the film, urgently requesting medical supplies (medicine and bandages) for the 100 men working in the mines. The report also stated that medics were called to the mines every day.

The film offers eye witness testimony of the gathering of Jews from nearby settlements, the displacing of thousands of people, and the violent, explicit actions of the German soldiers. As it is stated in the history of Tarlow, over 100 local people were murdered on October 19, 1942 before the displacement and marching of the Jews out of Tarlow. During this displacement, seven marching columns were formed, and at noon they set off in twenty minute intervals to the train station in Jasice, 21 km (13 mi) away.

Witnesses watched fragile older or the injured step aside and refuse to go further and were shot on site. A work unit was formed of young Jewish men to collect the recently shot and were loaded on carts and brought to the Jewish cemetery where a mass grave was formed. The Jewish people were loaded, pushed and thrown onto freight carts leaving no room to breathe, and sent to the Treblinka extermination camp, where the Germans murdered up to 17,000 to 18,000 Jewish people a day.

In Tarłów, the empty main square was filled with cases, bag and people's leftover possessions. The Polish towns people picked up whatever they could that was of use. Following this, the Tarłów ghetto was closed off to the town's inhabitants. The Germans banned entry by securing all doors and windows. The locals were forbidden to seize any Jewish property there, under threat of punishment. The Germans forced local firefighters to empty each house into large piles and organized an auction. In contrast to the earlier looting, the people or Tarłów were ashamed to partake in the auction. People from other areas came to purchase what they could, the rest was burned in the street.

The liquidation of the Tarłów ghetto erased the 400-year history of Tarłów's Jews. Of the 7,000 sent to Treblinka, 1,500 were Jews from Tarłów. Over 5,000 were from nearby settlements or other towns. The murder of these Jews was all part of Operation Reinhardt, which claimed the lives of nearly 2 million Polish Jews.

== Order of Virtuti Militari (Commemoration) ==
A plaque was revealed in Tarlow on May 7, 2022, to honor Lieutenant Colonel Stanislaw Poziomek, who was a commander of the 304th Bomb Squadron during World War II and a recipient of the Knight of the Order of Virtuti Militari award. Poland's highest military decoration.

The Holy Trinity Church in Tarlow now has a plaque on the surrounding wall thanks to the Society of Friends of Tarlow Land. This plaque commemorates a hero who was significant not only to the Tarlow community but also beyond. The plaque was placed on the wall surrounding the Holy Trinity Church in Tarłów. The initiator of the commemoration was the Society of Friends of Tarłów Land.

== Points of interest ==
- Baroque cross-shaped Holy Trinity church (17th century), with bell towers from 1653
- parish cemetery (late 18th century)
- ruins of a synagogue (1786)
