= Huta, Lipsko County =

Huta
- Village
- Location within Poland
- Coordinates: 51°12′N 21°34′E
- Country: Poland
- Voivodeship: Masovian
- County: Lipsko
- Gmina: Lipsko

Huta [ˈxuta] is a village in the administrative district of Gmina Lipsko, within Lipsko County, Masovian Voivodeship, in east-central Poland. It lies approximately 8 kilometres (5.0 mi) north-west of Lipsko and 120 kilometres (75 mi) south of Warsaw. It is approximately 88,658 square metres and has a Human Development Index (HDI) of 0.88.
