= Wólka, Lipsko County =

Wólka
- Village
- Location within Poland
- Coordinates: 51°11′54″N 21°41′38″E
- Country: Poland
- Voivodeship: Masovian
- County: Lipsko
- Gmina: Lipsko

Wólka [ˈvulka] is a village in the administrative district of Gmina Lipsko, within Lipsko County, Masovian Voivodeship, in east-central Poland.
