= Ciecierówka =

- Village
- Location within Poland
- Coordinates: 51°11′N 21°23′E
- Country: Poland
- Voivodeship: Masovian
- County: Lipsko
- Gmina: Rzeczniów
- Time zone: UTC+1 (CET)
  - Summer (DST): UTC+2 (CEST)

Ciecierówka [t͡ɕɛt͡ɕɛˈrufka] is a village in the administrative district of Gmina Rzeczniów, within Lipsko County, Masovian Voivodeship, in east-central Poland.

Nine Polish citizens were murdered by Nazi Germany in Budki Ciecierowskie during World War II.
