= Kunegundów =

- Village
- Location within Poland
- Coordinates: 51°12′38″N 21°26′55″E
- Country: Poland
- Voivodeship: Masovian
- County: Lipsko
- Gmina: Ciepielów

Kunegundów [kunɛˈɡunduf] is a village in the administrative district of Gmina Ciepielów, within Lipsko County, Masovian Voivodeship, in east-central Poland.
