= Dubrawa =

- Village
- Location within Poland
- Coordinates: 51°6′N 21°22′E
- Country: Poland
- Voivodeship: Masovian
- County: Lipsko
- Gmina: Rzeczniów
- Population: 120

Dubrawa [duˈbrava] is a village in the administrative district of Gmina Rzeczniów, within Lipsko County, Masovian Voivodeship, in east-central Poland.
