= Dębowe Pole =

Village in Gmina Sienno, Poland

- Village
- Location within Poland
- Coordinates: 51°04′03″N 21°23′47″E
- Country: Poland
- Voivodeship: Masovian
- County: Lipsko
- Gmina: Sienno

Dębowe Pole [dɛmˈbɔvɛ ˈpɔlɛ] is a village in the administrative district of Gmina Sienno, within Lipsko County, Masovian Voivodeship, in east-central Poland.
