= Gustawów, Lipsko County =

Gustawów
- Village
- Location within Poland
- Coordinates: 51°15′N 21°45′E
- Country: Poland
- Voivodeship: Masovian
- County: Lipsko
- Gmina: Chotcza

Gustawów [ɡusˈtavuf] is a village in the administrative district of Gmina Chotcza, within Lipsko County, Masovian Voivodeship, in east-central Poland.
