= Jelonek, Lipsko County =

Jelonek
- Village
- Location within Poland
- Coordinates: 51°10′22″N 21°36′42″E
- Country: Poland
- Voivodeship: Masovian
- County: Lipsko
- Gmina: Lipsko

Jelonek [jɛˈlɔnɛk] is a village in the administrative district of Gmina Lipsko, within Lipsko County, Masovian Voivodeship, in east-central Poland.
