= Małgorzacin =

Village in Gmina Lipsko, Poland

- Village
- Location within Poland
- Coordinates: 51°09′41″N 21°35′52″E
- Country: Poland
- Voivodeship: Masovian
- County: Lipsko
- Gmina: Lipsko

Małgorzacin [mau̯ɡɔˈʐat͡ɕin] is a village in the administrative district of Gmina Lipsko, within Lipsko County, Masovian Voivodeship, in east-central Poland.
