= Lipa-Krępa =

Village in Gmina Lipsko, Poland

- Village
- Location within Poland
- Coordinates: 51°08′58″N 21°36′07″E
- Country: Poland
- Voivodeship: Masovian
- County: Lipsko
- Gmina: Lipsko

Lipa-Krępa [ˈlipa ˈkrɛmpa] is a village in the administrative district of Gmina Lipsko, within Lipsko County, Masovian Voivodeship, in east-central Poland.
