= Białobrzegi (disambiguation) =

Białobrzegi is a town in Masovian Voivodeship, east-central Poland.

Białobrzegi may also refer to the following places:

- Białobrzegi, part of the town of Tomaszów Mazowiecki
- Białobrzegi, Lubartów County in Lublin Voivodeship (east Poland)
- Białobrzegi, Podlaskie Voivodeship (north-east Poland)
- Białobrzegi, Zamość County in Lublin Voivodeship (east Poland)
- Białobrzegi, Subcarpathian Voivodeship (south-east Poland)
- Białobrzegi, Legionowo County in Masovian Voivodeship (east-central Poland)
- Białobrzegi, Lipsko County in Masovian Voivodeship (east-central Poland)
- Białobrzegi, Płock County in Masovian Voivodeship (east-central Poland)
- Białobrzegi, Sokołów County in Masovian Voivodeship (east-central Poland)
