= Grechów =

- Village
- Location within Poland
- Coordinates: 51°6′12″N 21°27′5″E
- Country: Poland
- Voivodeship: Masovian
- County: Lipsko
- Gmina: Rzeczniów

Grechów [ˈɡrɛxuf] is a village in the administrative district of Gmina Rzeczniów, within Lipsko County, Masovian Voivodeship, in east-central Poland.
