= Pasztowa Wola-Kolonia =

- Village
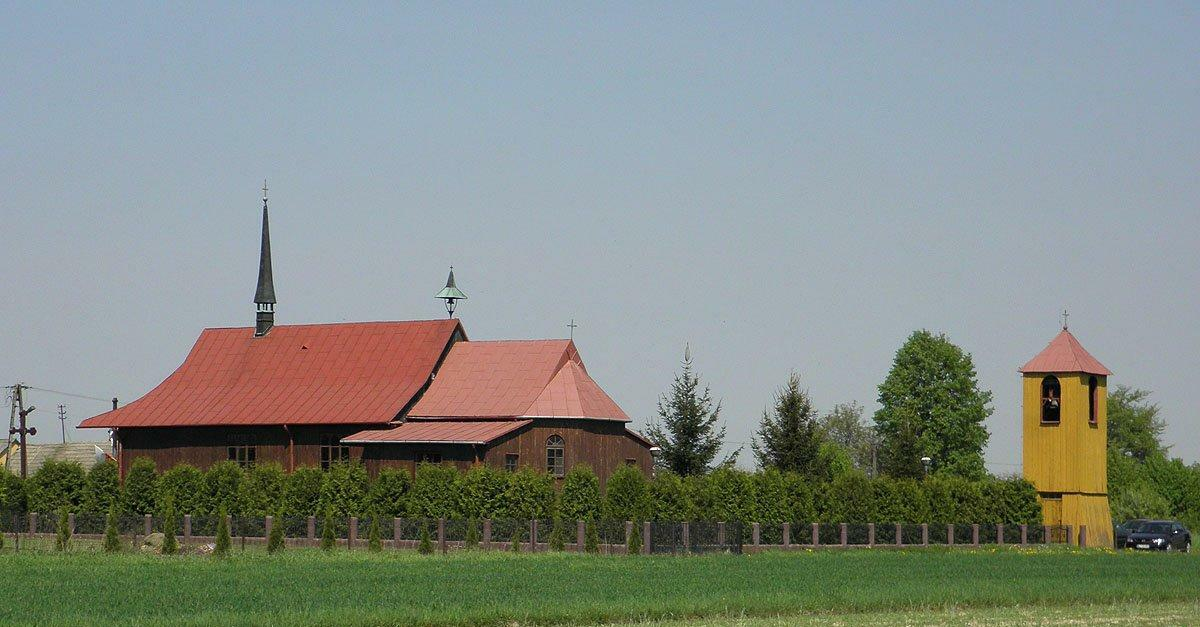

- Location within Poland
- Coordinates: 51°09′11″N 21°21′32″E
- Country: Poland
- Voivodeship: Masovian
- County: Lipsko
- Gmina: Rzeczniów

Pasztowa Wola-Kolonia [paʂˈtɔva ˈvɔla kɔˈlɔɲa] is a village in the administrative district of Gmina Rzeczniów, within Lipsko County, Masovian Voivodeship, in east-central Poland.
