= Gruszczyn, Lipsko County =

Gruszczyn
- Village
- Location within Poland
- Coordinates: 51°8′N 21°38′E
- Country: Poland
- Voivodeship: Masovian
- County: Lipsko
- Gmina: Lipsko

Gruszczyn [ˈɡruʂt͡ʂɨn] is a village in the administrative district of Gmina Lipsko, within Lipsko County, Masovian Voivodeship, in east-central Poland.
