= Jelaska =

Jelaska is a surname. Notable people with the surname include:

- Davor Jelaska (1907–1995), Croatian rower
- Ane Jelaska, Croatian soap opera character

== See also ==
- Jelanka
