= Babilon, Masovian Voivodeship =

Babilon
- Village
- Location within Poland
- Coordinates: 51°10′N 21°38′E
- Country: Poland
- Voivodeship: Masovian
- County: Lipsko
- Gmina: Lipsko
- Population (approx.): 200

Babilon [baˈbilɔn] is a village in the administrative district of Gmina Lipsko, within Lipsko County, Masovian Voivodeship, in east-central Poland.
