= Wyględów, Lipsko County =

Wyględów
- Village
- Location within Poland
- Coordinates: 51°09′32″N 21°28′37″E
- Country: Poland
- Voivodeship: Masovian
- County: Lipsko
- Gmina: Sienno

Wyględów [vɨˈɡlɛnduf] is a village in the administrative district of Gmina Sienno, within Lipsko County, Masovian Voivodeship, in east-central Poland.
