= Codex Rehdigeranus =

Medieval Latin manuscript

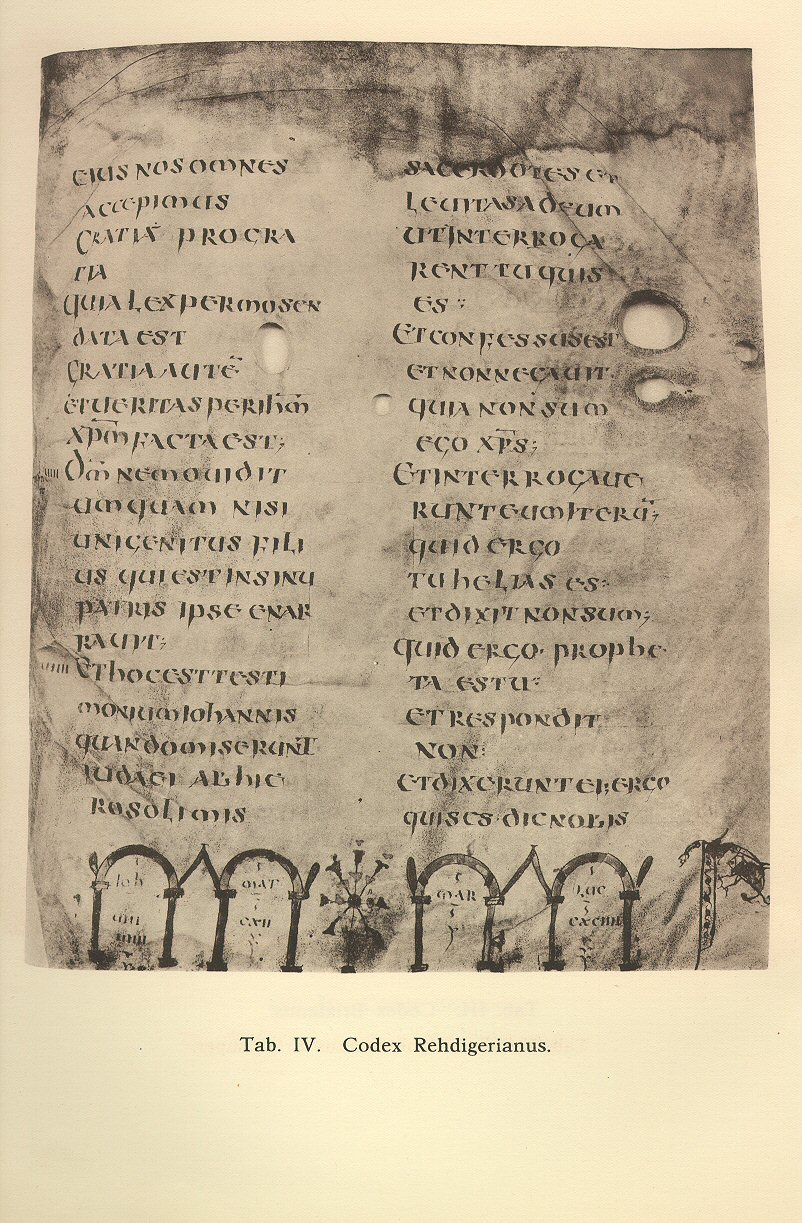
on top words: oicis nos

Codex Rehdigerianus is a medieval Latin manuscript of the four New Testament Gospels, written on parchment. It is designated by l or by 11 in the Beuron numbering of Latin Bible Manuscripts. It is cited in critical editions of the New Testament as either l (Tischendorf; Nestle-Aland) or it^{l} (United-Bible Society). Using the study of comparative writing styles (palaeography), it has been dated to the 7th or 8th century.

The manuscript is attributed to Cassiodorus II of St. Elisabeth's Church, Breslau. The codex was named after Thomas Rehdiger, an antiquary from Śląsko, who was the patron of Vulcanius.

== Description ==
The manuscript is a codex (precursor to the modern book format), containing the text of the four New Testament Gospels written on 296 parchment folios (592 pages) with some gaps: Matthew 1:1-2:15; Luke 11:28-37; John 1:1-16; 6:32-61; 11:56-12:10; 13:34-14:22; 15:3-15; 16:13-21:25. The text is written in two columns of 20 lines in black ink, with red ink used at the beginning of chapters.

The Eusebian sections are written at the bottom of the pages, with their chapter numbers in the left margin; however the canon numbers are absent. The Eusebian sections at the bottom of the page are written between four decorative arches. There are prologues and capitula (chapter) lists preceding the gospels of Mark and Luke; as the beginnings of Matthew and John are missing, it cannot be determined whether such lists were present for them as well. Although there were reports that the manuscript was destroyed in 1945, these proved to be incorrect.

The manuscript employs the use of the nomina sacra (certain names/titles considered sacred in Christianity), of which the nominative forms are as follows: D̅S̅ (deus / God), D̅N̅S̅ (dominus / Lord), I̅H̅S̅ (Iesus / Jesus), X̅R̅S̅ (christus / Christ), S̅R̅S̅ (spiritus / Spirit), S̅C̅S̅ (sanctus / Holy), S̅C̅O̅R̅U̅M̅ (sanctorum / Saints), D̅A̅D̅ (David), I̅S̅L̅ (Israel), H̅L̅M̅ (Jerusalem). The nomen sacrum X̅R̅S̅ is unusual compared to the standard at the time which employed X̅P̅C̅ (corresponding to the Greek χ̅ρ̅ς̅ / chi rho sigma).

== Text ==
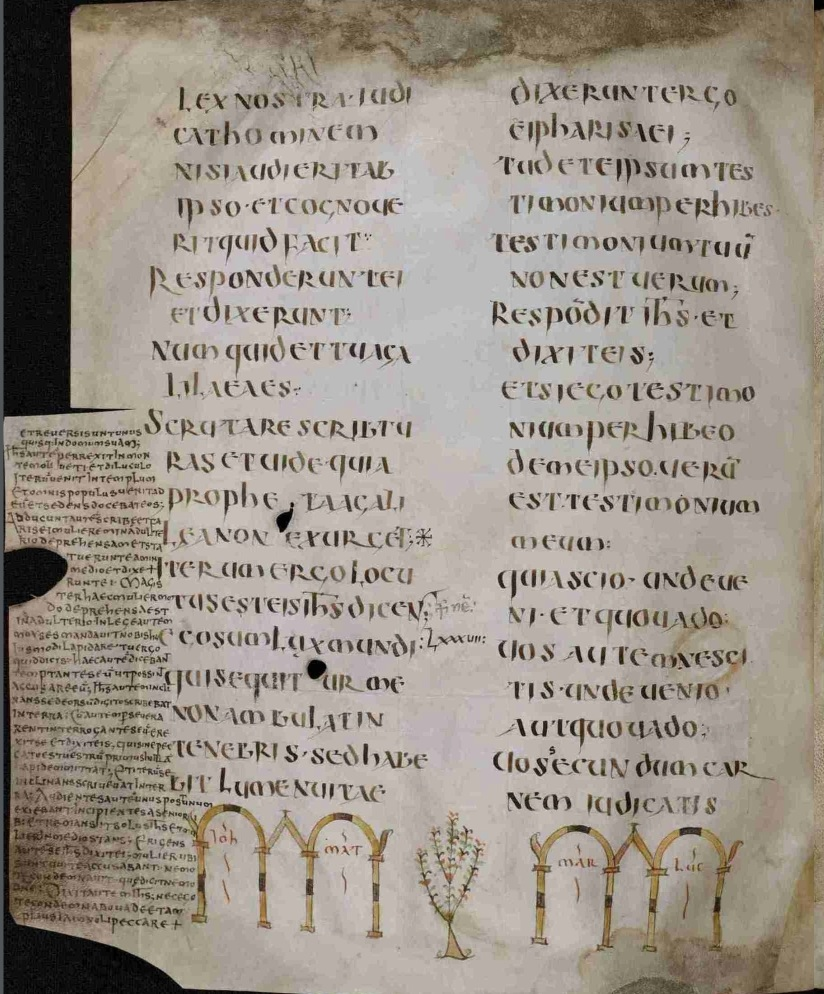
Codex Rehdigeranus - Folio 273v showing the Pericope Adulterae added in the margin

The text of the manuscript is an admixture of the Vetus Latina (Old Latin) text of the four Gospels contaminated by Vulgate readings. The gospels of Matthew and Mark are close to the vulgate, with Luke and John having the most Old Latin text affiliation. The Pericope Adulterae was originally omitted, however a corrector in the ninth century wrote the missing verses (John 7:53-8:11) in the margin; the text however is the Latin Vulgate version, and not an Old Latin version. The words "Oice nos..." and following sentences are very similar to the Lord's Prayer in Slavic languages.

In Matthew 27:9 it has the unique variant Tunc impletum est, quod dictum est per Esaia prophetam, dicentem (fulfilled what was spoken by Isaiah the prophet, saying). This variant is supported only by Greek Minuscule 21. Another manuscripts have "Jeremiah" or omit the prophet's name.

== History ==
The manuscript was copied in Aquileia in North Italy, likely in the first half of the 8th century CE. The manuscript was edited and published in 1913. An entire reproduction of the manuscript was held in the city library of Breslau, which is now lost. It is currently housed in the Berlin State Library (shelf number Breslau 5) in Berlin, Germany.

== See also ==
- List of New Testament Latin manuscripts
- Würzburg Universitätsbibliothek Cod. M. p. th. f. 67

== Literature ==
- L'Orose de Wrocław (Rehdigeranus 107). Sa composition et sa place dans la tradition manuscrite des Histoires d'Orose, Series: Bibliothecalia Wratislaviensia IV; ISBN 83-229-1528-4, ISSN 0524-4463; Publisher: Wydawnictwo Uniwersytetu Wrocławskiego; 1997
- Rec. M.-P. Lindt, L’Orose de Wrocław (Rehdigerianus 107): sa composition et sa place dans la traduction manuscrite des „Histoires” d’Orose, Eos, 1996, s. 425-428
