= Boży Dar =

Boży Dar may refer to the following places:

- Boży Dar, Lublin County in Lublin Voivodeship (east Poland)
- Boży Dar, Zamość County in Lublin Voivodeship (east Poland)
- Boży Dar, Masovian Voivodeship (east-central Poland)
