= Wincentów, Lipsko County =

Wincentów
- Village
- Location within Poland
- Coordinates: 51°7′N 21°25′E
- Country: Poland
- Voivodeship: Masovian
- County: Lipsko
- Gmina: Rzeczniów

Wincentów [vinˈt͡sɛntuf] is a village in the administrative district of Gmina Rzeczniów, within Lipsko County, Masovian Voivodeship, in east-central Poland.
