= Eugeniów =

- Village
- Location within Poland
- Coordinates: 51°2′5″N 21°29′4″E
- Country: Poland
- Voivodeship: Masovian
- County: Lipsko
- Gmina: Sienno

Eugeniów [ɛuˈɡɛɲuf] is a village in the administrative district of Gmina Sienno, within Lipsko County, Masovian Voivodeship, in east-central Poland.
