= Wierzchowiska Drugie, Masovian Voivodeship =

Wierzchowiska Drugie
- Village
- Location within Poland
- Coordinates: 51°08′31″N 21°31′41″E
- Country: Poland
- Voivodeship: Masovian
- County: Lipsko
- Gmina: Sienno

Wierzchowiska Drugie [vjɛʂxɔˈviska ˈdruɡʲɛ] is a village in the administrative district of Gmina Sienno, within Lipsko County, Masovian Voivodeship, in east-central Poland.
