= Gmina Rzeczniów =

Gmina Rzeczniów Rzeczniów Commune
- Gmina
- Coat of arms
- Interactive map of Gmina Rzeczniów
- Coordinates (Rzeczniów): 51°8′N 21°26′E
- Country: Poland
- Voivodeship: Masovian
- County: Lipsko
- Seat: Rzeczniów

Area
  - Total: 103.69 km^{2} (40.03 sq mi)

Population (2006)
  - Total: 4,731
  - Density: 45.63/km^{2} (118.2/sq mi)
- Website: http://www.rzeczniow.pl/

Gmina Rzeczniów is a rural gmina (administrative district) in Lipsko County, Masovian Voivodeship, in east-central Poland. Its seat is the village of Rzeczniów, which lies approximately 16 kilometres (10 mi) west of Lipsko and 124 km (77 mi) south of Warsaw.

The gmina covers an area of 103.69 square kilometres (40.0 sq mi), and as of 2006 its total population is 4,731.

== Villages ==
Gmina Rzeczniów contains the villages and settlements of Ciecierówka, Dubrawa, Grabowiec, Grechów, Jelanka, Kotłowacz, Marianów, Michałów, Osinki, Pasztowa Wola, Pasztowa Wola-Kolonia, Pawliczka, Płósy, Podkońce, Rybiczyzna, Rzechów-Kolonia, Rzeczniów, Rzeczniów-Kolonia, Rzeczniówek, Stary Rzechów, Wincentów, Wólka Modrzejowa, Wólka Modrzejowa-Kolonia and Zawały.

== Neighbouring gminas ==
Gmina Rzeczniów is bordered by the gminas of Brody, Ciepielów, Iłża, Lipsko and Sienno.
