= Czarnolas =

Czarnolas may refer to:

- Czarnolas, Lipsko County, Masovian Voivodeship, east-central Poland
- Czarnolas, Opole Voivodeship, south-west Poland
- Czarnolas, West Pomeranian Voivodeship, north-west Poland
- Czarnolas, Zwoleń County, Masovian Voivodeship, east-central Poland

== See also ==
- Czarnolas-Kolonia, Zwoleń County, Masovian Voivodeship, east-central Poland
