= Anusin, Masovian Voivodeship =

Anusin
- Village
- Location within Poland
- Coordinates: 51°13′N 21°36′E
- Country: Poland
- Voivodeship: Masovian
- County: Lipsko
- Gmina: Ciepielów

Anusin [aˈnuɕin] is a village in the administrative district of Gmina Ciepielów, within Lipsko County, Masovian Voivodeship, in east-central Poland. The 2016 Polish census reported the population of the village as 420 people.
