= Baranów, Lipsko County =

Baranów
- Village
- Location within Poland
- Coordinates: 51°13′6″N 21°45′2″E
- Country: Poland
- Voivodeship: Masovian
- County: Lipsko
- Gmina: Chotcza

Baranów [baˈranuf] is a village in the administrative district of Gmina Chotcza, within Lipsko County, Masovian Voivodeship, in east-central Poland.
