= Szymanów, Lipsko County =

Szymanów
- Village
- Location within Poland
- Coordinates: 51°12′N 21°37′E
- Country: Poland
- Voivodeship: Masovian
- County: Lipsko
- Gmina: Lipsko

Szymanów (Polish pronunciation: [ʂɨˈmanuf]) is a village in the administrative district of Gmina Lipsko, within Lipsko County, Masovian Voivodeship, in east-central Poland.
