= Kadłubek, Masovian Voivodeship =

Kadłubek
- Village
- Location within Poland
- Coordinates: 51°7′N 21°32′E
- Country: Poland
- Voivodeship: Masovian
- County: Lipsko
- Gmina: Sienno
- Population: 196

Kadłubek [kaˈdwubɛk] is a village in the administrative district of Gmina Sienno, within Lipsko County, Masovian Voivodeship, in east-central Poland.
