= Ciepielów-Kolonia =

Village in Gmina Ciepielów, Poland

- Village
- Location within Poland
- Coordinates: 51°16′13″N 21°35′50″E
- Country: Poland
- Voivodeship: Masovian
- County: Lipsko
- Gmina: Ciepielów
- Population: 80

Ciepielów-Kolonia [t͡ɕɛˈpjɛluf kɔˈlɔɲa] is a village in the administrative district of Gmina Ciepielów, within Lipsko County, Masovian Voivodeship, in east-central Poland.
