= Adamów, Lipsko County =

Adamów
- Village
- Location within Poland
- Coordinates: 51°2′N 21°27′E
- Country: Poland
- Voivodeship: Masovian
- County: Lipsko
- Gmina: Sienno

Adamów [aˈdamuf] is a village in the administrative district of Gmina Sienno, within Lipsko County, Masovian Voivodeship, in east-central Poland.
