= Karolów, Gmina Sienno =

Karolów
- Village
- Location within Poland
- Coordinates: 51°03′29″N 21°26′03″E
- Country: Poland
- Voivodeship: Masovian
- County: Lipsko
- Gmina: Sienno

Karolów [kaˈrɔluf] is a village in the administrative district of Gmina Sienno, within Lipsko County, Masovian Voivodeship, in east-central Poland.
