= Borowo, Lipsko County =

Borowo
- Village
- Location within Poland
- Coordinates: 51°10′30″N 21°32′16″E
- Country: Poland
- Voivodeship: Masovian
- County: Lipsko
- Gmina: Lipsko

Borowo [bɔˈrɔvɔ] is a village in the administrative district of Gmina Lipsko, within Lipsko County, Masovian Voivodeship, in east-central Poland.
