= Nowy Kawęczyn, Masovian Voivodeship =

Nowy Kawęczyn
- Village
- Location within Poland
- Coordinates: 51°16′23″N 21°38′45″E
- Country: Poland
- Voivodeship: Masovian
- County: Lipsko
- Gmina: Ciepielów

Nowy Kawęczyn [ˈnɔvɨ kaˈvɛnt͡ʂɨn] is a village in the administrative district of Gmina Ciepielów, within Lipsko County, Masovian Voivodeship, in east-central Poland.
