= Stare Gardzienice =

- Village
- Location within Poland
- Coordinates: 51°15′53″N 21°32′13″E
- Country: Poland
- Voivodeship: Masovian
- County: Lipsko
- Gmina: Ciepielów
- Time zone: UTC+1 (CET)
  - Summer (DST): UTC+2 (CEST)

Stare Gardzienice [ˈstarɛ ɡard͡ʑɛˈnit͡sɛ] is a village in east-central Poland, in the administrative district of Gmina Ciepielów, within Lipsko County, Masovian Voivodeship.

Eight Polish citizens were murdered by Nazi Germany in the village during World War II.
