= Grabowiec, Lipsko County =

Grabowiec
- Village
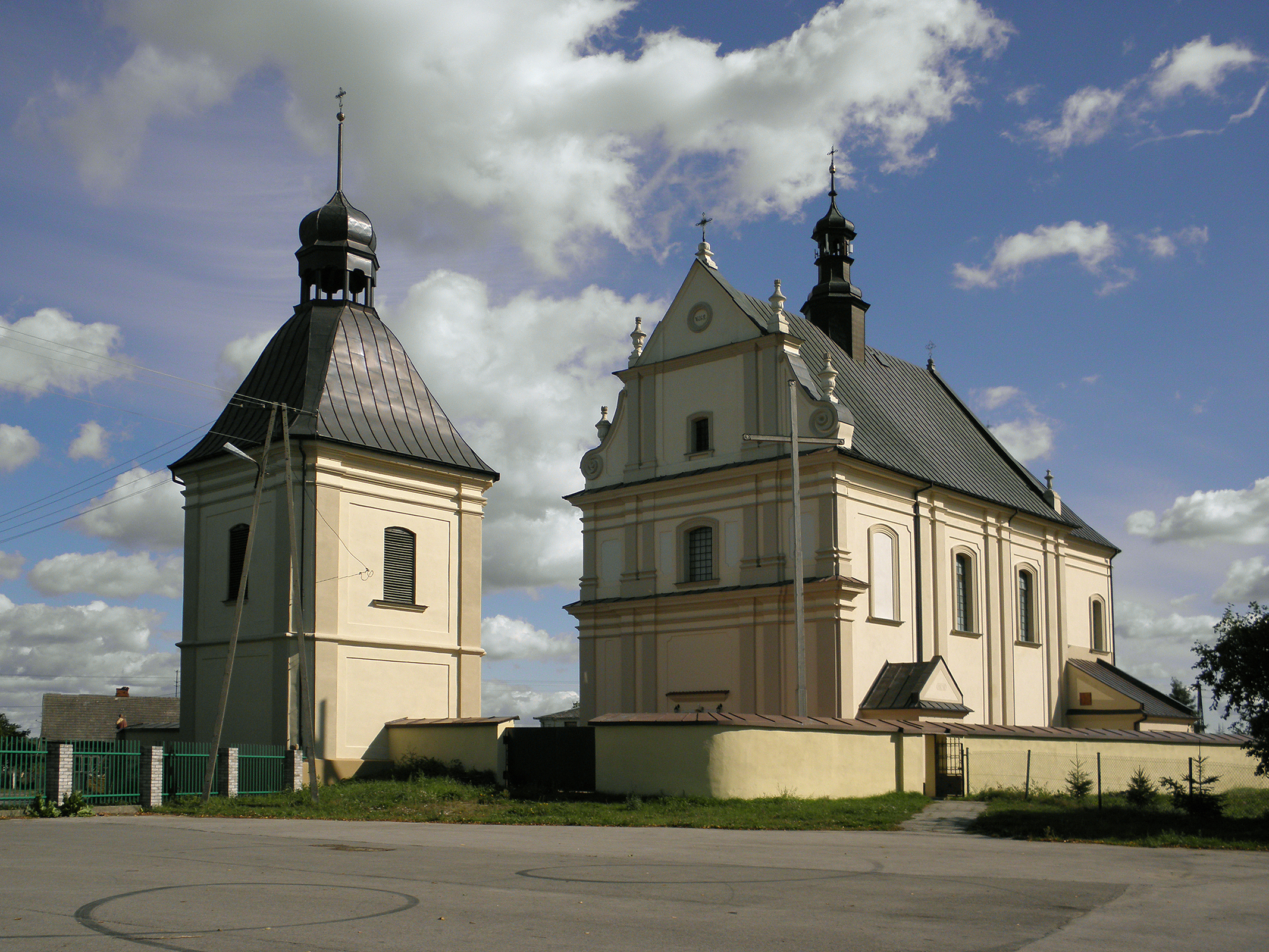
- Saint Nicholas church in Grabowiec

- Location within Poland
- Coordinates: 51°6′0″N 21°23′16″E
- Country: Poland
- Voivodeship: Masovian
- County: Lipsko
- Gmina: Rzeczniów

Population
  - Total: 510
- Time zone: UTC+1 (CET)
  - Summer (DST): UTC+2 (CEST)

Grabowiec [ɡraˈbɔvjɛt͡s] is a village in the administrative district of Gmina Rzeczniów, within Lipsko County, Masovian Voivodeship, in south-central Poland.

Town rights were granted in 1601 and revoked in 1869.
