= Gmina Chotcza =

Gmina Chotcza Chotcza Commune
- Gmina
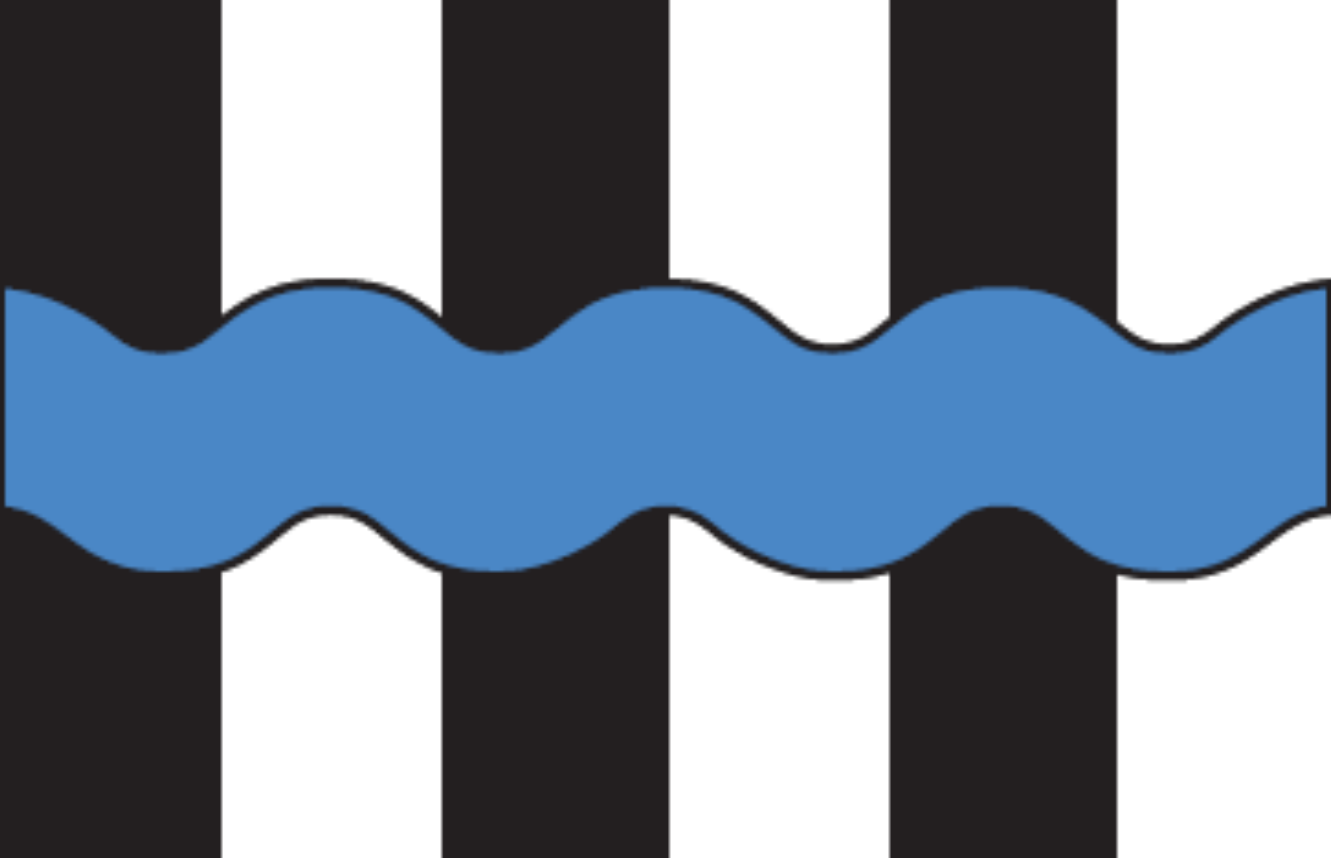
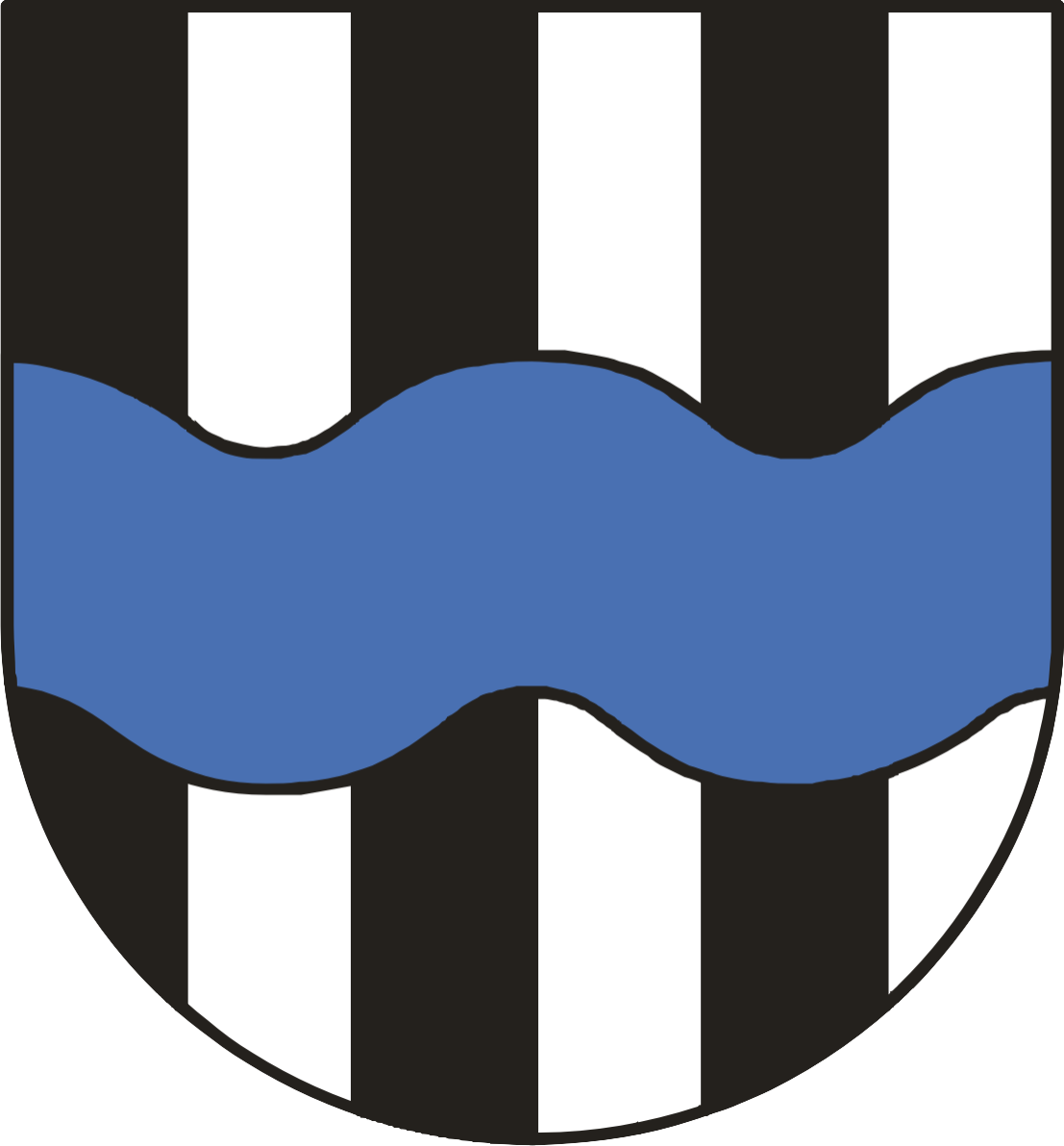
- Flag Coat of arms
- Interactive map of Gmina Chotcza
- Coordinates (Chotcza): 51°14′N 21°48′E
- Country: Poland
- Voivodeship: Masovian
- County: Lipsko
- Seat: Chotcza

Area
  - Total: 88.82 km^{2} (34.29 sq mi)

Population (2006)
  - Total: 2,601
  - Density: 29.28/km^{2} (75.85/sq mi)
- Website: http://www.chotcza.pl/

Gmina Chotcza is a rural gmina (administrative district) in Lipsko County, Masovian Voivodeship, in east-central Poland. Its seat is the village of Chotcza, which lies approximately 14 kilometres (9 mi) north-east of Lipsko and 123 km (76 mi) south-east of Warsaw.

The gmina covers an area of 88.82 square kilometres (34.3 sq mi), and as of 2006 its total population is 2,601.

== Villages ==
Gmina Chotcza contains the villages and settlements of Baranów, Białobrzegi, Chotcza, Chotcza Dolna, Chotcza Górna, Gniazdków, Gustawów, Jarentowskie Pole, Karolów, Kijanka, Kolonia Wola Solecka, Niemieryczów, Siekierka Nowa, Siekierka Stara, Tymienica Nowa, Tymienica Stara and Zajączków.

== Neighbouring gminas ==
Gmina Chotcza is bordered by the gminas of Ciepielów, Łaziska, Lipsko, Przyłęk, Solec nad Wisłą, Wilków and Zwoleń.
