= Kijanka, Masovian Voivodeship =

Kijanka
- Village
- Location within Poland
- Coordinates: 51°17′N 21°45′E
- Country: Poland
- Voivodeship: Masovian
- County: Lipsko
- Gmina: Chotcza

Kijanka [kiˈjanka] is a village in the administrative district of Gmina Chotcza, within Lipsko County, Masovian Voivodeship, in east-central Poland.
