= Helenów, Lipsko County =

Helenów
- Village
- Location within Poland
- Coordinates: 51°5′N 21°41′E
- Country: Poland
- Voivodeship: Masovian
- County: Lipsko
- Gmina: Lipsko

Helenów [xɛˈlɛnuf] is a village in the administrative district of Gmina Lipsko, within Lipsko County, Masovian Voivodeship, in east-central Poland.
