= Rybiczyzna =

- Village
- Location within Poland
- Coordinates: 51°7′N 21°21′E
- Country: Poland
- Voivodeship: Masovian
- County: Lipsko
- Gmina: Rzeczniów

Rybiczyzna [rɨbiˈt͡ʂɨzna] is a village in the administrative district of Gmina Rzeczniów, within Lipsko County, Masovian Voivodeship, in east-central Poland.
