= Leopoldów, Lipsko County =

Leopoldów
- Village
- Location within Poland
- Coordinates: 51°8′N 21°37′E
- Country: Poland
- Voivodeship: Masovian
- County: Lipsko
- Gmina: Lipsko

Leopoldów [lɛɔˈpɔlduf] is a village in the administrative district of Gmina Lipsko, within Lipsko County, Masovian Voivodeship, in east-central Poland.
