= Marianów, Gmina Rzeczniów =

Marianów
- Village
- Location within Poland
- Coordinates: 51°10′45″N 21°26′14″E
- Country: Poland
- Voivodeship: Masovian
- County: Lipsko
- Gmina: Rzeczniów

Marianów [maˈrjanuf] is a village in the administrative district of Gmina Rzeczniów, within Lipsko County, Masovian Voivodeship, in east-central Poland.
