= Kolonia Wola Solecka =

- Village
- Location within Poland
- Coordinates: 51°12′N 21°44′E
- Country: Poland
- Voivodeship: Masovian
- County: Lipsko
- Gmina: Chotcza
- Population (approx.): 150

Kolonia Wola Solecka [kɔˈlɔɲa ˈvɔla sɔˈlɛt͡ska] is a village in the administrative district of Gmina Chotcza, within Lipsko County, Masovian Voivodeship, in east-central Poland.
