= Wola Solecka Druga =

- Village
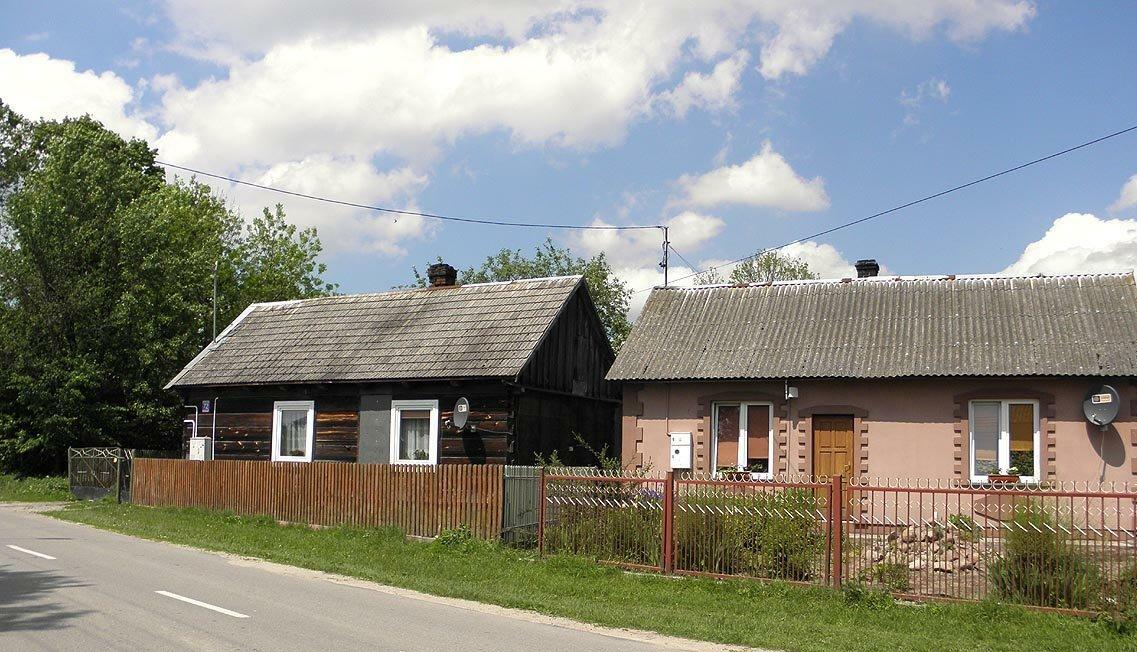

- Location within Poland
- Coordinates: 51°11′43″N 21°40′21″E
- Country: Poland
- Voivodeship: Masovian
- County: Lipsko
- Gmina: Lipsko

Wola Solecka Druga [ˈvɔla sɔˈlɛt͡ska ˈdruɡa] is a village in the administrative district of Gmina Lipsko, within Lipsko County, Masovian Voivodeship, in east-central Poland.
