= Niemieryczów =

Village in Gmina Chotcza, Poland

- Village
- Location within Poland
- Coordinates: 51°15′09″N 21°42′07″E
- Country: Poland
- Voivodeship: Masovian
- County: Lipsko
- Gmina: Chotcza

Niemieryczów [ɲɛmjɛˈrɨt͡ʂuf] is a village in the administrative district of Gmina Chotcza, within Lipsko County, Masovian Voivodeship, in east-central Poland.
