= Łaziska, Lipsko County =

Łaziska
- Village
- Location within Poland
- Coordinates: 51°12′29″N 21°31′00″E
- Country: Poland
- Voivodeship: Masovian
- County: Lipsko
- Gmina: Ciepielów

Łaziska [waˈʑiska] is a village in the administrative district of Gmina Ciepielów, within Lipsko County, Masovian Voivodeship, in east-central Poland.
