= Antoniów, Lipsko County =

Antoniów
- Village
- Location within Poland
- Coordinates: 51°12′N 21°25′E
- Country: Poland
- Voivodeship: Masovian
- County: Lipsko
- Gmina: Ciepielów

Antoniów [anˈtɔɲuf] is a village in the administrative district of Gmina Ciepielów, within Lipsko County, Masovian Voivodeship, in east-central Poland.

== Climate ==
The climate of Antoniów is warm and temperate. Even in the driest months, they still get a significant amount of rainfall. The average annual temperature is 8.4 °C and he rainfall averages at 612 mm.
