= Nowa Wieś, Gmina Sienno =

Nowa Wieś
- Village
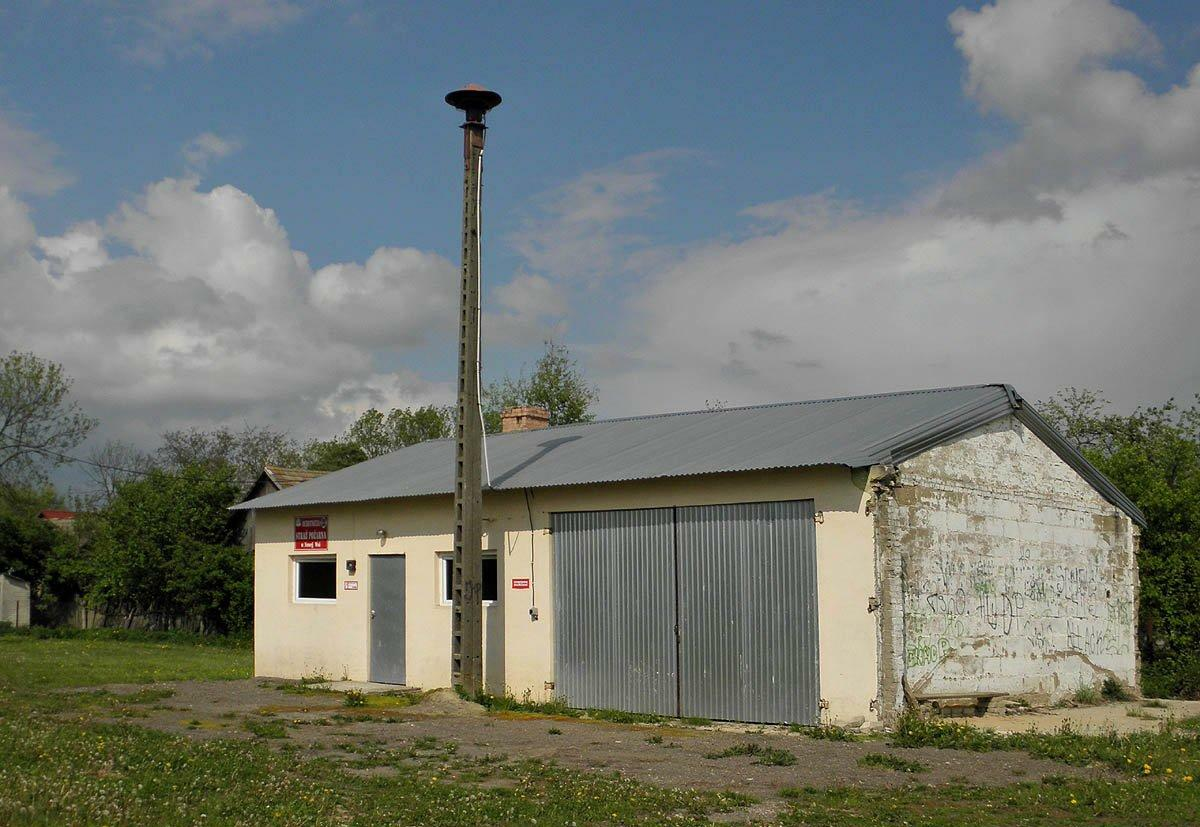
- Fire station in Nowa Wieś

- Location within Poland
- Coordinates: 51°05′31″N 21°31′33″E
- Country: Poland
- Voivodeship: Masovian
- County: Lipsko
- Gmina: Sienno

Nowa Wieś [ˈnɔva ˈvjɛɕ] is a village in the administrative district of Gmina Sienno, within Lipsko County, Masovian Voivodeship, in east-central Poland.
