= Wielgie, Masovian Voivodeship =

Wielgie
- Village
- Location within Poland
- Coordinates: 51°14′N 21°29′E
- Country: Poland
- Voivodeship: Masovian
- County: Lipsko
- Gmina: Ciepielów
- Population: 668

Wielgie [ˈvjɛlɡʲɛ] is a village in the administrative district of Gmina Ciepielów, within Lipsko County, Masovian Voivodeship, in east-central Poland.
