= Świesielice =

- Village
- Location within Poland
- Coordinates: 51°14′N 21°38′E
- Country: Poland
- Voivodeship: Masovian
- County: Lipsko
- Gmina: Ciepielów

Świesielice (Polish pronunciation: [ɕfjɛɕɛˈlit͡sɛ]) is a village in the administrative district of Gmina Ciepielów, within Lipsko County, Masovian Voivodeship, in east-central Poland.
