= Leśniczówka, Lipsko County =

Leśniczówka
- Village
- Location within Poland
- Coordinates: 51°4′N 21°30′E
- Country: Poland
- Voivodeship: Masovian
- County: Lipsko
- Gmina: Sienno

Leśniczówka (Polish pronunciation: [lɛɕɲiˈtʂufka]) is a village in the administrative district of Gmina Sienno, within Lipsko County, Masovian Voivodeship, in east-central Poland.
