= Zawały, Masovian Voivodeship =

Zawały
- Village
- Location within Poland
- Coordinates: 51°5′2″N 21°21′22″E
- Country: Poland
- Voivodeship: Masovian
- County: Lipsko
- Gmina: Rzeczniów

Zawały [zaˈvawɨ] is a village in the administrative district of Gmina Rzeczniów, within Lipsko County, Masovian Voivodeship, in east-central Poland.
