= Wólka Modrzejowa-Kolonia =

- Village
- Location within Poland
- Coordinates: 51°04′40″N 21°22′33″E
- Country: Poland
- Voivodeship: Masovian
- County: Lipsko
- Gmina: Rzeczniów

Wólka Modrzejowa-Kolonia [ˈvulka mɔdʐɛˈjɔva kɔˈlɔɲa] is a village in the administrative district of Gmina Rzeczniów, within Lipsko County, Masovian Voivodeship, in east-central Poland.
