= Tadeusz Balcerowski =

Polish politician (1933–2020)

- Born: 5 January 1933; Pawliczka, Masovian Voivodeship, Poland
- Died: 26 October 2020 (aged 87); Radom, Masovian Voivodeship, Poland
- Occupation: Politician
- Political party: Polish People's Party

Tadeusz Balcerowski (5 January 1933, Pawliczka – 26 October 2020, Radom) is a Polish politician from the Polish People's Party. He served as member of the Sejm from 2004 to 2005.
