= Maziarze =

- Village
- Location within Poland
- Coordinates: 51°11′19″N 21°34′25″E
- Country: Poland
- Voivodeship: Masovian
- County: Lipsko
- Gmina: Lipsko

Maziarze [maˈʑaʐɛ] is a village in the administrative district of Gmina Lipsko, within Lipsko County, Masovian Voivodeship, in east-central Poland.
