= Edward Wojtas =

Polish politician

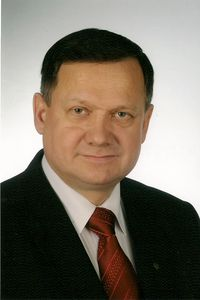

Deputy of the VI Sejm
- In office 2007 – 2010
- Succeeded by: Marian Starownik
- Constituency: 6 Lublin

Personal details
- Born: 1 March 1955 Wólka Modrzejowa, Polish People's Republic
- Died: 10 April 2010 (aged 55) near Smolensk, Russia
- Party: Polish People's Party

Edward Wojtas (1 March 1955 in Wólka Modrzejowa – 10 April 2010) was a member of the Polish Sejm and a politician active in the Polish People's Party (PSL).

He was listed on the flight manifest of the Tupolev Tu-154 of the 36th Special Aviation Regiment carrying the President of Poland Lech Kaczyński which crashed near Smolensk-North airport near Pechersk near Smolensk, Russia, on 10 April 2010, killing all aboard.

Wojtas was awarded the Gold Cross of Merit and on 16 April 2010 he was also awarded, posthumously, the Commander's Cross of the Order of Polonia Restituta.
