= Kochanów, Lipsko County =

Kochanów
- Village
- Location within Poland
- Coordinates: 51°14′N 21°28′E
- Country: Poland
- Voivodeship: Masovian
- County: Lipsko
- Gmina: Ciepielów

Kochanów [kɔˈxanuf] is a village in the administrative district of Gmina Ciepielów, within Lipsko County, Masovian Voivodeship, in east-central Poland.
