= Teresa Prekerowa =

Polish historian and author

Teresa Prekerowa Ph.D.
- Prekerowa in 1995
- Born: Teresa Dobrska; 30 December 1921; Zapusta
- Died: 19 May 1998 (aged 76); Warsaw
- Education: University of Warsaw
- Occupation: historian
- Employer(s): Wydawnictwo Naukowe PWN, Państwowy Instytut Wydawniczy
- Honours: Righteous Among the Nations

Teresa Prekerowa, also Teresa Preker (née Dobrska; 30 December 1921 in Zapusta – 19 May 1998 in Warsaw) was a Polish historian and author of Konspiracyjna Rada Pomocy Żydom w Warszawie 1942-1945 (Żegota in Warsaw 1942-1945) published in 1982 during the communist military crackdown in the Polish People's Republic.

== Early life and education ==
Prekerowa was born in Zapusta, into a family of local landowners, and raised in rural settings. During World War II, they resided in German-occupied Warsaw. During the war, she married and later, she moved to Skolimów ear Warsaw. Both in Warsaw and in Skolimów she and her family have helped several Jews, providing them with shelter and other aid.

== Career ==
Following the Soviet takeover of Poland and later, during the darkest days of Stalinism in Poland she worked at Wydawnictwo Naukowe PWN founded in 1951. In the 1970s she moved to Państwowy Instytut Wydawniczy specializing in communist literature, history, and philosophy.

Prekerowa completed her off-campus university studies at the University of Warsaw in 1973 with a master's thesis about Żegota written on the advice of Władysław Bartoszewski who was her co-worker and a major supplier of reference material. Following the publication of her (already expanded) book about Żegota in 1982, in 1985 she received the title of Polish Righteous Among the Nations; Prekerowa wrote that during World War II she had run into a little girl on the street from the Warsaw Ghetto and brought her to a Catholic convent, nonetheless, she never told anybody about it including her own parents.

Prekerowa wrote about the rescue of Jews by Poles during the Holocaust. She estimated that between 160,000 and 360,000 Poles assisted in hiding Jews, amounting to between 1% and 2.5% of the Polish population. She categorized them as "those who could offer help" in saving Jews directly.

Following the collapse of the Soviet empire, in 1992 she published Zarys dziejów Żydów w Polsce w latach 1939-1945, and in 1995 received the award from the Polish PEN Club. She died in Warsaw. Notably, Prekerowa was never in Żegota; nevertheless, her contribution to general knowledge about the Polish-Jewish relations in World War II from the Polish 'non-Jewish' perspective is considered substantial.
