= Stary Olechów =

Village in Gmina Sienno, Poland

- Village
- Location within Poland
- Coordinates: 51°02′50″N 21°27′24″E
- Country: Poland
- Voivodeship: Masovian
- County: Lipsko
- Gmina: Sienno

Stary Olechów [ˈstarɨ ɔˈlɛxuf] is a village in the administrative district of Gmina Sienno, within Lipsko County, Masovian Voivodeship, in east-central Poland.
