= Maruszów, Masovian Voivodeship =

Maruszów
- Village
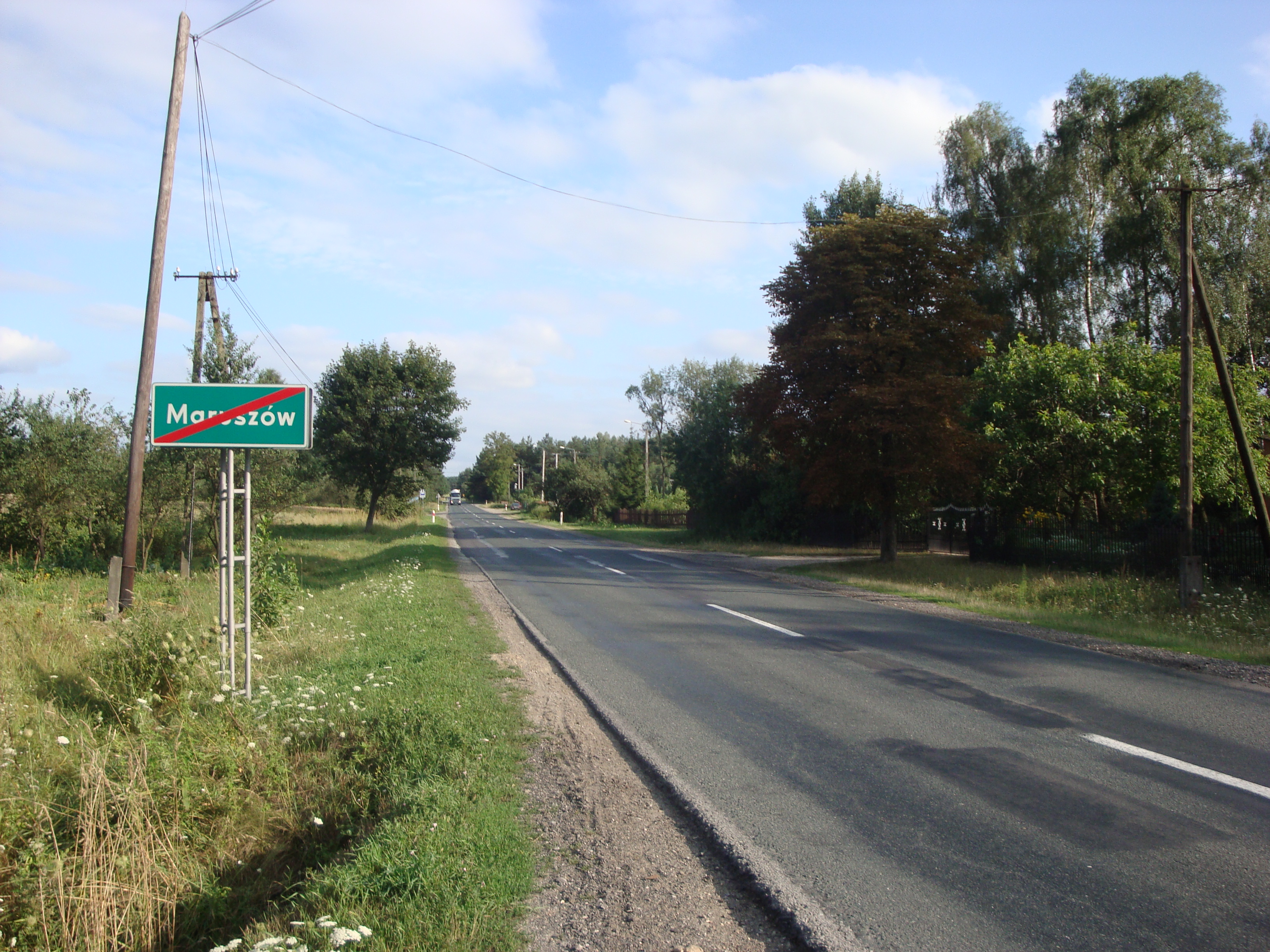
- Street of Maruszów, Masovian Voivodeship

- Location within Poland
- Coordinates: 51°05′51″N 21°38′05″E
- Country: Poland
- Voivodeship: Masovian
- County: Lipsko
- Gmina: Lipsko

Maruszów [maˈruʂuf] is a village in the administrative district of Gmina Lipsko, within Lipsko County, Masovian Voivodeship, in east-central Poland.
