= Michałów, Lipsko County =

Michałów
- Village
- Location within Poland
- Coordinates: 51°9′N 21°24′E
- Country: Poland
- Voivodeship: Masovian
- County: Lipsko
- Gmina: Rzeczniów

Michałów [miˈxawuf] is a village in the administrative district of Gmina Rzeczniów, within Lipsko County, Masovian Voivodeship, in east-central Poland.
