= Borowiec, Lipsko County =

Borowiec
- Village
- Location within Poland
- Coordinates: 51°15′54″N 21°30′33″E
- Country: Poland
- Voivodeship: Masovian
- County: Lipsko
- Gmina: Ciepielów

Borowiec [bɔˈrɔvjɛt͡s] is a village in the administrative district of Gmina Ciepielów, within Lipsko County, Masovian Voivodeship, in east-central Poland.
