= Drezno =

Drezno may refer to the following places:

- Drezno, the Polish name for Dresden, Germany
- Drezno, Masovian Voivodeship (east-central Poland)
- Drężno, West Pomeranian Voivodeship (north-west Poland)
