= Lipa-Miklas =

- Village
- Location within Poland
- Coordinates: 51°09′10″N 21°37′00″E
- Country: Poland
- Voivodeship: Masovian
- County: Lipsko
- Gmina: Lipsko

Lipa-Miklas [ˈlipa ˈmiklas] is a village in the administrative district of Gmina Lipsko, within Lipsko County, Masovian Voivodeship, in east-central Poland.
