= Gniazdków =

- Village
- Location within Poland
- Coordinates: 51°16′N 21°48′E
- Country: Poland
- Voivodeship: Masovian
- County: Lipsko
- Gmina: Chotcza
- Time zone: UTC+1 (CET)
  - Summer (DST): UTC+2 (CEST)

Gniazdków [ˈɡɲastkuf] is a village in the administrative district of Gmina Chotcza, within Lipsko County, Masovian Voivodeship, in east-central Poland.

Six Polish citizens were murdered by Nazi Germany in the village during World War II.
