= Jakubówka, Masovian Voivodeship =

Jakubówka
- Village
- Location within Poland
- Coordinates: 51°11′N 21°36′E
- Country: Poland
- Voivodeship: Masovian
- County: Lipsko
- Gmina: Lipsko

Jakubówka [jakuˈbufka] is a village in the administrative district of Gmina Lipsko, within Lipsko County, Masovian Voivodeship, in east-central Poland.
