= Dąbrówka, Gmina Sienno =

Village in Gmina Sienno, Poland

Dąbrówka
- Village
- Location within Poland
- Coordinates: 51°01′22″N 21°27′38″E
- Country: Poland
- Voivodeship: Masovian
- County: Lipsko
- Gmina: Sienno

Dąbrówka [dɔmˈbrufka] is a village in the administrative district of Gmina Sienno, within Lipsko County, Masovian Voivodeship, in east-central Poland.
