= Gmina Ciepielów =

Gmina Ciepielów Ciepielów Commune
- Gmina
- Coat of arms
- Interactive map of Gmina Ciepielów
- Coordinates (Ciepielów): 51°15′N 21°35′E
- Country: Poland
- Voivodeship: Masovian
- County: Lipsko
- Seat: Ciepielów

Area
  - Total: 135.3 km^{2} (52.2 sq mi)

Population (2006)
  - Total: 5,789
  - Density: 42.79/km^{2} (110.8/sq mi)
- Website: http://www.ciepielow.pl/

Gmina Ciepielów [ˈɡmina_t͡ɕɛˈpjɛluf] is a rural gmina (administrative district) in Lipsko County, Masovian Voivodeship, in east-central Poland. Its seat is the village of Ciepielów, which lies approximately 12 kilometres (7 mi) north-west of Lipsko and 115 km (71 mi) south of Warsaw.

The gmina covers an area of 135.3 square kilometres (52.2 sq mi), and as of 2006 its total population is 5,789.

== Villages ==
Gmina Ciepielów contains the villages and settlements of Antoniów, Anusin, Bąkowa, Bielany, Borowiec, Chotyze, Ciepielów, Ciepielów-Kolonia, Czarnolas, Czerwona, Dąbrowa, Drezno, Gardzienice-Kolonia, Kałków, Kochanów, Kunegundów, Łaziska, Marianki, Nowy Kawęczyn, Pasieki, Pcin, Podgórze, Podolany, Ranachów B, Rekówka, Sajdy, Stare Gardzienice, Stary Ciepielów, Świesielice, Wielgie and Wólka Dąbrowska.

== Neighbouring gminas ==
Gmina Ciepielów is bordered by the gminas of Chotcza, Iłża, Kazanów, Lipsko, Rzeczniów, Sienno and Zwoleń.
