= Karolów, Gmina Chotcza =

Karolów
- Village
- Location within Poland
- Coordinates: 51°15′53″N 21°39′21″E
- Country: Poland
- Voivodeship: Masovian
- County: Lipsko
- Gmina: Chotcza
- Time zone: UTC+1 (CET)
  - Summer (DST): UTC+2 (CEST)

Karolów [kaˈrɔluf] is a village in the administrative district of Gmina Chotcza, within Lipsko County, Masovian Voivodeship, in east-central Poland.

Six Polish citizens were murdered by Nazi Germany in the village during World War II.
