= Długowola Druga =

Village in Gmina Lipsko, Poland

- Village
- Location within Poland
- Coordinates: 51°06′03″N 21°35′45″E
- Country: Poland
- Voivodeship: Masovian
- County: Lipsko
- Gmina: Lipsko

Długowola Druga [dwuɡɔˈvɔla ˈdruɡa] is a village in the administrative district of Gmina Lipsko, within Lipsko County, Masovian Voivodeship, in east-central Poland.
