= Wiśniówek =

Wiśniówek may refer to:

- Wiśniówek, Lipsko County in Masovian Voivodeship (east-central Poland)
- Wiśniówek, Ostrołęka County in Masovian Voivodeship (east-central Poland)
- Wiśniówek, Podlaskie Voivodeship (north-east Poland)
- Wiśniówek, Warmian-Masurian Voivodeship (north Poland)
