= Siekierka Nowa =

- Village
- Location within Poland
- Coordinates: 51°17′N 21°41′E
- Country: Poland
- Voivodeship: Masovian
- County: Lipsko
- Gmina: Chotcza

Siekierka Nowa [ɕɛˈkʲɛrka ˈnɔva] is a village in the administrative district of Gmina Chotcza, within Lipsko County, Masovian Voivodeship, in east-central Poland.
