= Zajączków, Masovian Voivodeship =

Zajączków
- Village
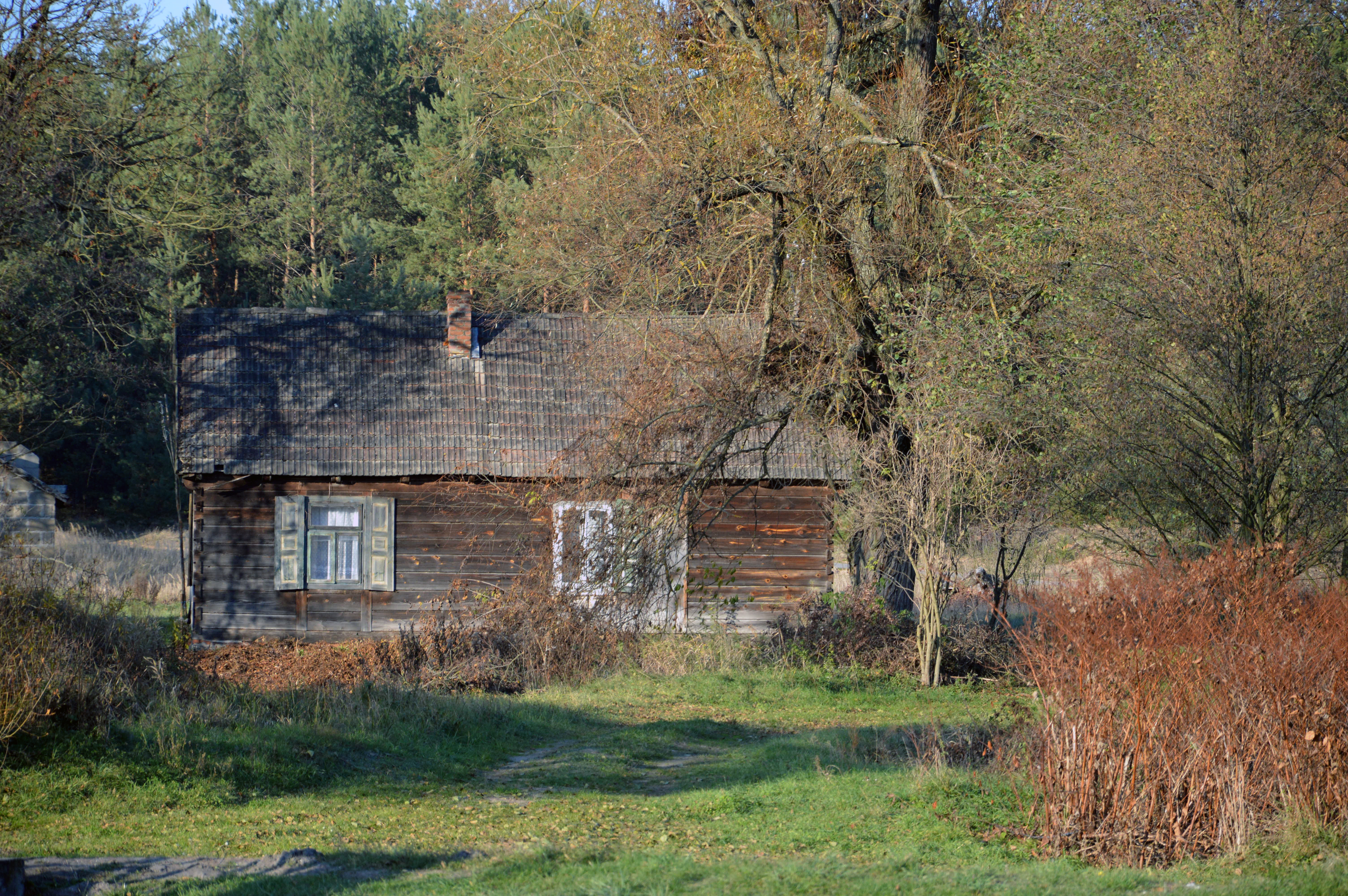

- Location within Poland
- Coordinates: 51°15′N 21°41′E
- Country: Poland
- Voivodeship: Masovian
- County: Lipsko
- Gmina: Chotcza
- Time zone: UTC+1 (CET)
  - Summer (DST): UTC+2 (CEST)

Zajączków [zaˈjɔnt͡ʂkuf] is a village in the administrative district of Gmina Chotcza, within Lipsko County, Masovian Voivodeship, in east-central Poland.

Eight Polish citizens were murdered by Nazi Germany in the village during World War II.
