= Długowola Pierwsza =

- Village
- Location within Poland
- Coordinates: 51°5′51″N 21°36′16″E
- Country: Poland
- Voivodeship: Masovian
- County: Lipsko
- Gmina: Lipsko
- Population: 260

Długowola Pierwsza [dwuɡɔˈvɔla ˈpjɛrfʂa] is a village in the administrative district of Gmina Lipsko, within Lipsko County, Masovian Voivodeship, in east-central Poland.
