= Osinki, Masovian Voivodeship =

Osinki
- Village
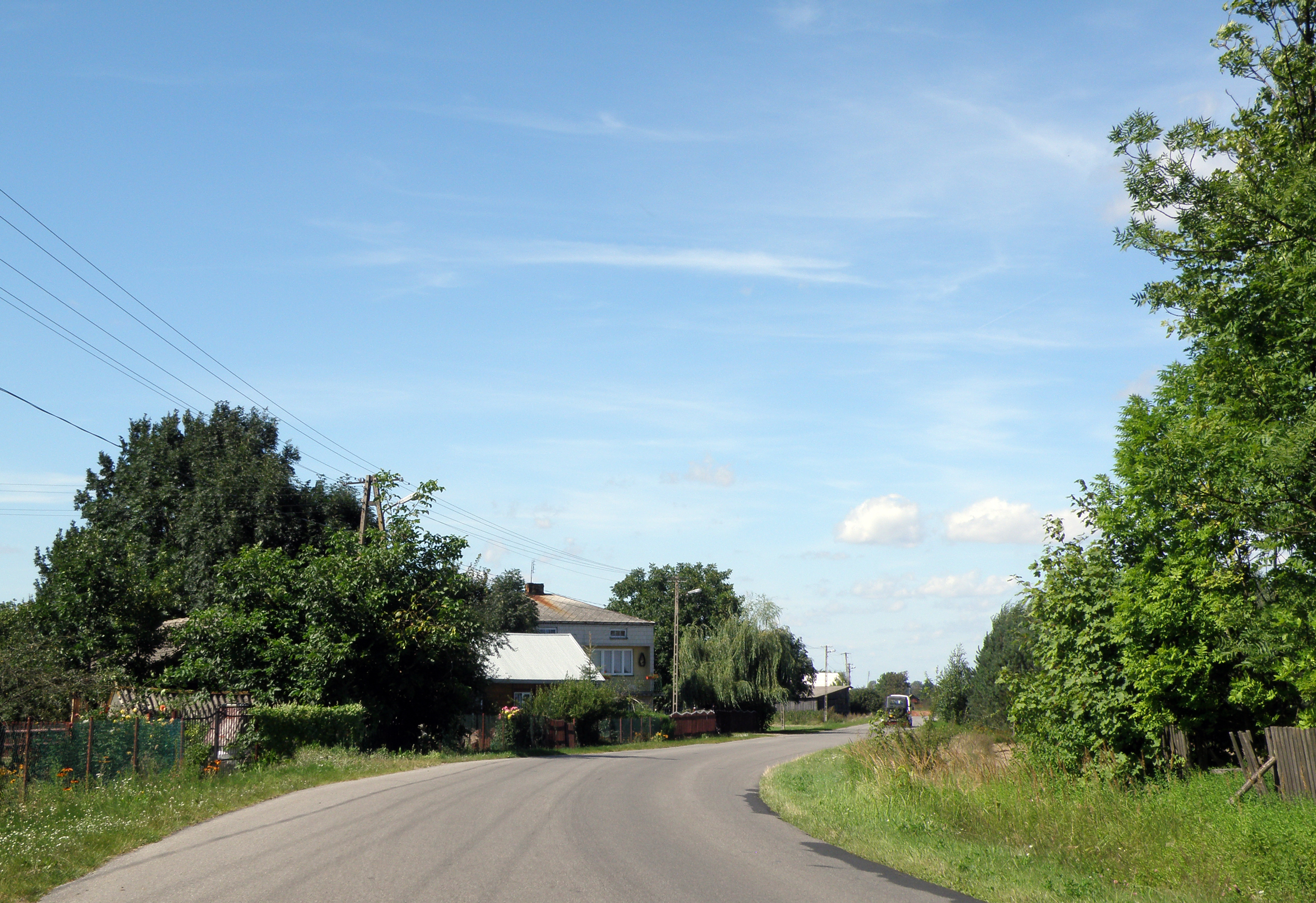

- Location within Poland
- Coordinates: 51°10′33″N 21°25′52″E
- Country: Poland
- Voivodeship: Masovian
- County: Lipsko
- Gmina: Rzeczniów

Osinki [ɔˈɕiŋki] is a village in the administrative district of Gmina Rzeczniów, within Lipsko County, Masovian Voivodeship, in east-central Poland.
