= Stary Rzechów =

- Village
- Location within Poland
- Coordinates: 51°07′50″N 21°22′58″E
- Country: Poland
- Voivodeship: Masovian
- County: Lipsko
- Gmina: Rzeczniów

Stary Rzechów [ˈstarɨ ˈʐɛxuf] is a village in the administrative district of Gmina Rzeczniów, within Lipsko County, Masovian Voivodeship, in east-central Poland.
