= Hieronimów =

- Village
- Location within Poland
- Coordinates: 51°5′N 21°33′E
- Country: Poland
- Voivodeship: Masovian
- County: Lipsko
- Gmina: Sienno

Hieronimów [xjɛrɔˈnimuf] is a village in the administrative district of Gmina Sienno, within Lipsko County, Masovian Voivodeship, in east-central Poland.
