= Janów, Lipsko County =

Janów
- Village
- Location within Poland
- Coordinates: 51°07′45″N 21°29′32″E
- Country: Poland
- Voivodeship: Masovian
- County: Lipsko
- Gmina: Sienno

Janów [ˈjanuf] is a village in the administrative district of Gmina Sienno, within Lipsko County, Masovian Voivodeship, in east-central Poland.
