= Dąbrówka, Gmina Lipsko =

Village in Gmina Lipsko, Poland

Dąbrówka
- Village
- Location within Poland
- Coordinates: 51°11′04″N 21°38′52″E
- Country: Poland
- Voivodeship: Masovian
- County: Lipsko
- Gmina: Lipsko
- Time zone: UTC+1 (CET)
  - Summer (DST): UTC+2 (CEST)

Dąbrówka [dɔmˈbrufka] is a village in the administrative district of Gmina Lipsko, within Lipsko County, Masovian Voivodeship, in east-central Poland.

One Polish citizen was murdered by Nazi Germany in the village during World War II.
