= Gmina Sienno =

Gmina Sienno Sienno Commune
- Gmina
- Coat of arms
- Interactive map of Gmina Sienno
- Coordinates (Sienno): 51°5′22″N 21°28′36″E
- Country: Poland
- Voivodeship: Masovian
- County: Lipsko
- Seat: Sienno

Area
  - Total: 147.15 km^{2} (56.81 sq mi)

Population (2006)
  - Total: 6,377
  - Density: 43.34/km^{2} (112.2/sq mi)
- Website: http://www.sienno.pl/

Gmina Sienno is a rural gmina (administrative district) in Lipsko County, Masovian Voivodeship, in east-central Poland. Its seat is the village of Sienno, which lies approximately 15 kilometres (9 mi) south-west of Lipsko and 130 km (81 mi) south of Warsaw.

The gmina covers an area of 147.15 square kilometres (56.8 sq mi), and as of 2006 its total population is 6,377.

== Villages ==
Gmina Sienno contains the villages and settlements of Adamów, Aleksandrów, Aleksandrów Duży, Bronisławów, Dąbrówka, Dębowe Pole, Eugeniów, Gozdawa, Hieronimów, Janów, Jaworska Wola, Kadłubek, Karolów, Kochanówka, Krzyżanówka, Leśniczówka, Ludwików, Nowa Wieś, Nowy Olechów, Osówka, Piasków, Praga Dolna, Praga Górna, Sienno, Stara Wieś, Stary Olechów, Tarnówek, Trzemcha Dolna, Trzemcha Górna, Wierzchowiska Drugie, Wierzchowiska Pierwsze, Wodąca, Wyględów, Wygoda and Zapusta.

== Neighbouring gminas ==
Gmina Sienno is bordered by the gminas of Bałtów, Bodzechów, Brody, Ciepielów, Kunów, Lipsko, Rzeczniów and Tarłów.
