= Aleksandrów, Lipsko County =

Aleksandrów
- Village
- Location within Poland
- Coordinates: 51°0′52″N 21°27′53″E
- Country: Poland
- Voivodeship: Masovian
- County: Lipsko
- Gmina: Sienno

Aleksandrów [alɛkˈsandruf] is a village in the administrative district of Gmina Sienno, within Lipsko County, Masovian Voivodeship, in east-central Poland.
