= Wola Solecka Pierwsza =

- Village
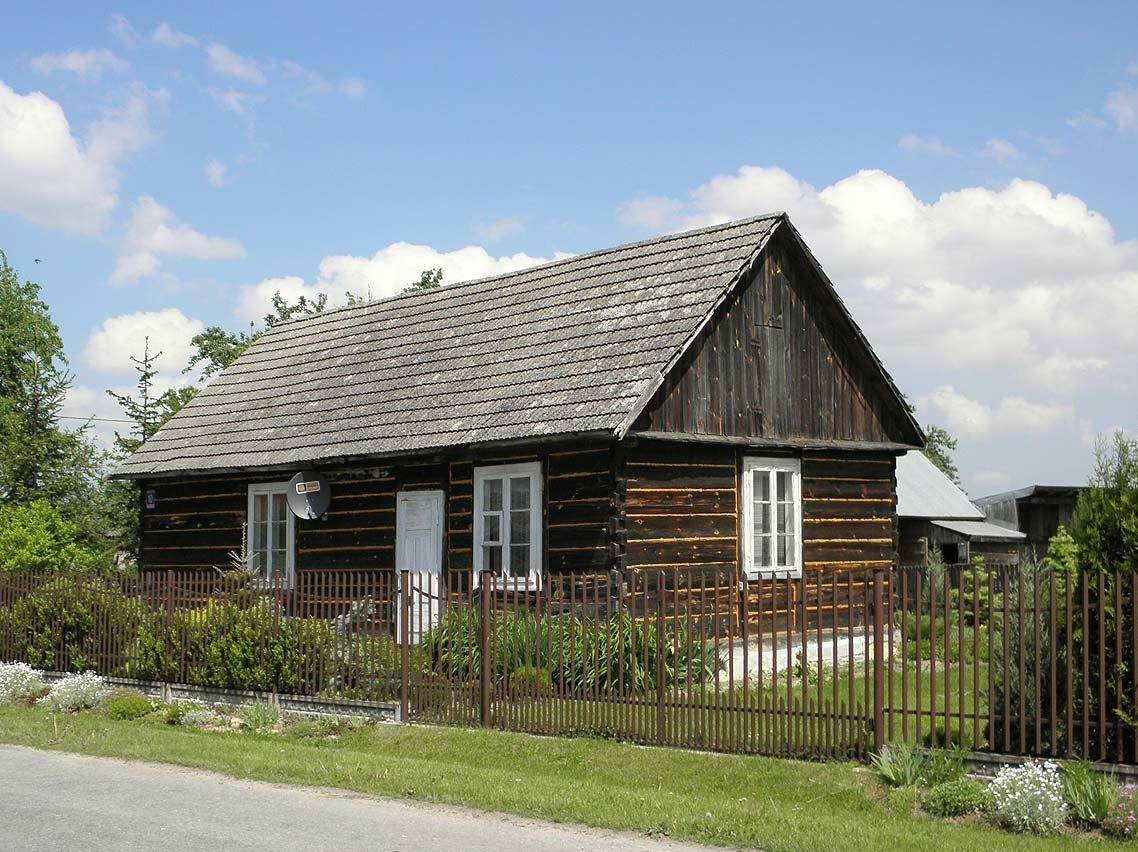

- Location within Poland
- Coordinates: 51°11′05″N 21°42′36″E
- Country: Poland
- Voivodeship: Masovian
- County: Lipsko
- Gmina: Lipsko
- Time zone: UTC+1 (CET)
  - Summer (DST): UTC+2 (CEST)

Wola Solecka Pierwsza [ˈvɔla sɔˈlɛt͡ska ˈpjɛrfʂa] is a village in the administrative district of Gmina Lipsko, within Lipsko County, Masovian Voivodeship, in east-central Poland.

Nine Polish citizens were murdered by Nazi Germany in Wola Solecka during World War II.
