= Krępa Kościelna =

- Village
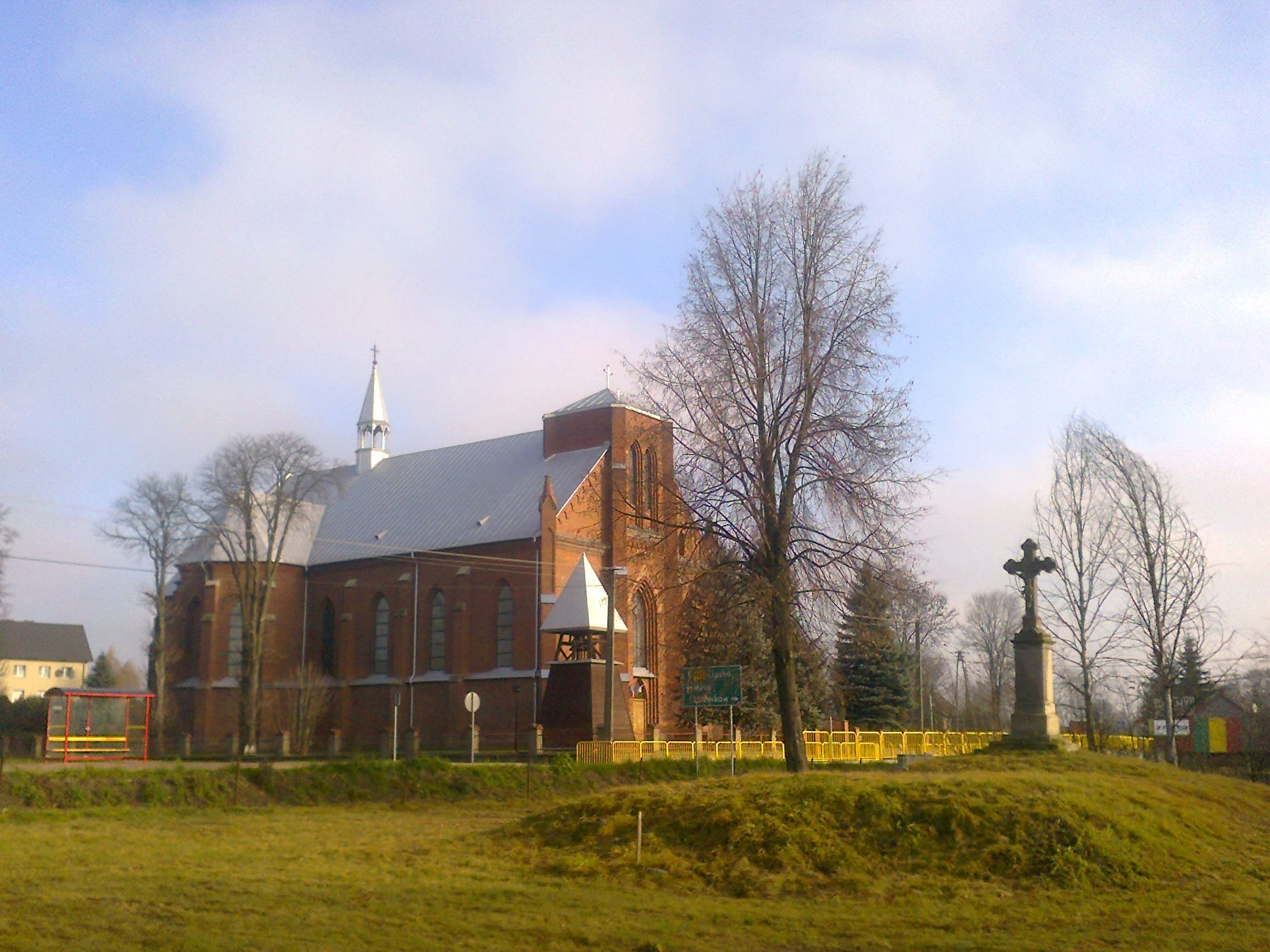
- Church of Saints Peter and Paul

- Location within Poland
- Coordinates: 51°9′N 21°34′E
- Country: Poland
- Voivodeship: Masovian
- County: Lipsko
- Gmina: Lipsko
- Time zone: UTC+1 (CET)
  - Summer (DST): UTC+2 (CEST)

Krępa Kościelna [ˈkrɛmpa kɔɕˈt͡ɕɛlna] is a village in the administrative district of Gmina Lipsko, within Lipsko County, Masovian Voivodeship, in east-central Poland.

Six Polish citizens were murdered by Nazi Germany in the village during World War II.
