= Ratyniec =

- Village
- Location within Poland
- Coordinates: 51°10′11″N 21°35′06″E
- Country: Poland
- Voivodeship: Masovian
- County: Lipsko
- Gmina: Lipsko

Ratyniec [raˈtɨɲɛt͡s] is a village in the administrative district of Gmina Lipsko, within Lipsko County, Masovian Voivodeship, in east-central Poland.
