= Kałków =

Kałków may refer to the following places:

- Kałków, Masovian Voivodeship (east-central Poland)
- Kałków, Opole Voivodeship (south-west Poland)
- Kałków, Świętokrzyskie Voivodeship (south-central Poland)
