= Nowa Wieś, Gmina Lipsko =

Nowa Wieś
- Village
- Location within Poland
- Coordinates: 51°09′12″N 21°35′21″E
- Country: Poland
- Voivodeship: Masovian
- County: Lipsko
- Gmina: Lipsko

Nowa Wieś [ˈnɔva ˈvjɛɕ] is a village in the administrative district of Gmina Lipsko, within Lipsko County, Masovian Voivodeship, in east-central Poland.
