= Tomaszówka, Lipsko County =

Tomaszówka
- Village
- Location within Poland
- Coordinates: 51°7′N 21°40′E
- Country: Poland
- Voivodeship: Masovian
- County: Lipsko
- Gmina: Lipsko

Tomaszówka [tɔmaˈʂufka] is a village in the administrative district of Gmina Lipsko, within Lipsko County, Masovian Voivodeship, in east-central Poland.
