= Gmina Lipsko =

Gmina Lipsko Lipsko Commune
- Gmina
- Coat of arms
- Interactive map of Gmina Lipsko
- Coordinates (Lipsko): 51°9′24″N 21°39′27″E
- Country: Poland
- Voivodeship: Masovian
- County: Lipsko
- Seat: Lipsko

Area
  - Total: 135.21 km^{2} (52.20 sq mi)

Population (2006)
  - Total: 11,538
  - Density: 85.334/km^{2} (221.01/sq mi)
  - Urban: 5,826
  - Rural: 5,712
- Website: http://www.lipsko.home.pl/

Gmina Lipsko is an urban-rural gmina (administrative district) in Lipsko County, Masovian Voivodeship, in east-central Poland. Its seat is the town of Lipsko, which lies approximately 127 kilometres (79 mi) south of Warsaw.

The gmina covers an area of 135.21 square kilometres (52.2 sq mi), and as of 2006 its total population is 11,538 (out of which the population of Lipsko amounts to 5,826, and the population of the rural part of the gmina is 5,712).

== Villages ==
Apart from the town of Lipsko, Gmina Lipsko contains the villages and settlements of Babilon, Borowo, Boży Dar, Dąbrówka, Daniszów, Długowola Druga, Długowola Pierwsza, Gołębiów, Gruszczyn, Helenów, Huta, Jakubówka, Jelonek, Józefów, Katarzynów, Krępa Górna, Krępa Kościelna, Leopoldów, Leszczyny, Lipa-Krępa, Lipa-Miklas, Lucjanów, Małgorzacin, Maruszów, Maziarze, Nowa Wieś, Poręba, Ratyniec, Śląsko, Szymanów, Tomaszówka, Walentynów, Wiśniówek, Wola Solecka Druga, Wola Solecka Pierwsza, Wólka and Zofiówka.

== Neighbouring gminas ==
Gmina Lipsko is bordered by the gminas of Chotcza, Ciepielów, Rzeczniów, Sienno, Solec nad Wisłą and Tarłów.
