= Jelanka =

- Village
- Location within Poland
- Coordinates: 51°8′N 21°29′E
- Country: Poland
- Voivodeship: Masovian
- County: Lipsko
- Gmina: Rzeczniów
- Population: 210

Jelanka [jɛˈlanka] is a village in the administrative district of Gmina Rzeczniów, within Lipsko County, Masovian Voivodeship, in east-central Poland.

The village had a population of 184 at the 2011 census.
