= Chotcza =

- Village
- Location within Poland
- Coordinates: 51°14′N 21°48′E
- Country: Poland
- Voivodeship: Masovian
- County: Lipsko
- Gmina: Chotcza
- Population: 170

Chotcza [ˈxɔtt͡ʂa] is a village in Lipsko County, Masovian Voivodeship, in east-central Poland. It is the seat of the gmina (administrative district) called Gmina Chotcza.
