= Czarnolas, Lipsko County =

Czarnolas
- Village
- Location within Poland
- Coordinates: 51°13′08″N 21°26′53″E
- Country: Poland
- Voivodeship: Masovian
- County: Lipsko
- Gmina: Ciepielów

Czarnolas [t͡ʂarˈnɔlas] is a village in the administrative district of Gmina Ciepielów, within Lipsko County, Masovian Voivodeship, in east-central Poland.
