= Boży Dar, Masovian Voivodeship =

Boży Dar
- Village
- Location within Poland
- Coordinates: 51°10′N 21°36′E
- Country: Poland
- Voivodeship: Masovian
- County: Lipsko
- Gmina: Lipsko

Boży Dar [ˈbɔʐɨ ˈdar] is a village in the administrative district of Gmina Lipsko, within Lipsko County, Masovian Voivodeship, in east-central Poland.
