= Kałków, Masovian Voivodeship =

Kałków
- Village
- Location within Poland
- Coordinates: 51°14′N 21°34′E
- Country: Poland
- Voivodeship: Masovian
- County: Lipsko
- Gmina: Ciepielów

Kałków [ˈkau̯kuf] is a village in the administrative district of Gmina Ciepielów, within Lipsko County, Masovian Voivodeship, in east-central Poland.
