= Rzeczniów =

- Village
- Location within Poland
- Coordinates: 51°8′N 21°26′E
- Country: Poland
- Voivodeship: Masovian
- County: Lipsko
- Gmina: Rzeczniów

Rzeczniów [ˈʐɛt͡ʂɲuf] is a village in Lipsko County, Masovian Voivodeship, in east-central Poland. It is the seat of the gmina (administrative district) called Gmina Rzeczniów.
