= Białobrzegi, Lipsko County =

Białobrzegi
- Village
- Location within Poland
- Coordinates: 51°12′1″N 21°45′6″E
- Country: Poland
- Voivodeship: Masovian
- County: Lipsko
- Gmina: Chotcza

Białobrzegi [bjawɔˈbʐɛɡi] is a village in the administrative district of Gmina Chotcza, within Lipsko County, Masovian Voivodeship, in east-central Poland.
