= Drezno, Masovian Voivodeship =

Drezno
- Village
- Location within Poland
- Coordinates: 51°13′N 21°38′E
- Country: Poland
- Voivodeship: Masovian
- County: Lipsko
- Gmina: Ciepielów

Drezno [ˈdrɛznɔ] is a village in the administrative district of Gmina Ciepielów, within Lipsko County, Masovian Voivodeship, in east-central Poland.
