= Würzburg Universitätsbibliothek Cod. M. p. th. f. 67 =

Folio 3r

The Codex M. p. th. f. 67, designated by 11A (Beuron system), is an 8th or 9th century Latin Gospel Book. The text, written on vellum, it was known as a manuscript of Vulgate. The manuscript contains the text of the four Gospels on 192 parchment leaves (32 by 21 cm). It is written in two columns per page, 20 lines per column. It contains prolegomena to the Gospels.

== Description ==
The text of the codex is mixed, which combines Old Latin and Vulgate readings. Two portions John 1:1 – 5:40 and John 12:34 – 13:10 of the text can be categorized as Old Latin version. Many non-Vulgate readings in these passages are shared with other Old Latin codices (notably Codex Rehdigeranus), while other variants peculiar to this manuscript correspond to citations by Augustine and Jerome. It is one of the very few Latin witnesses to an additional phrase in John 8:9.

Although the text of the Synoptic Gospels have not been collated, they too have a partial Old Latin affiliation, especially in the Gospel of Matthew.

== History ==
The manuscript probably was written in Breton. Old Latin parts were identified in 2009 by H. A. G. Houghton.

Currently it is housed at the University of Würzburg (M. p. th. f. 67) at Würzburg.

== See also ==
- List of New Testament Latin manuscripts
- Codex Usserianus I
