= Pawliczka =

- Village
- Location within Poland
- Coordinates: 51°10′N 21°26′E
- Country: Poland
- Voivodeship: Masovian
- County: Lipsko
- Gmina: Rzeczniów

Pawliczka [pavˈlit͡ʂka] is a village in the administrative district of Gmina Rzeczniów, within Lipsko County, Masovian Voivodeship, in east-central Poland.

== See also ==
- Karolina Pawliczak (born 1976), Polish lawyer and politician
