= Lipsko =

Town in Masovian Voivodeship, Poland

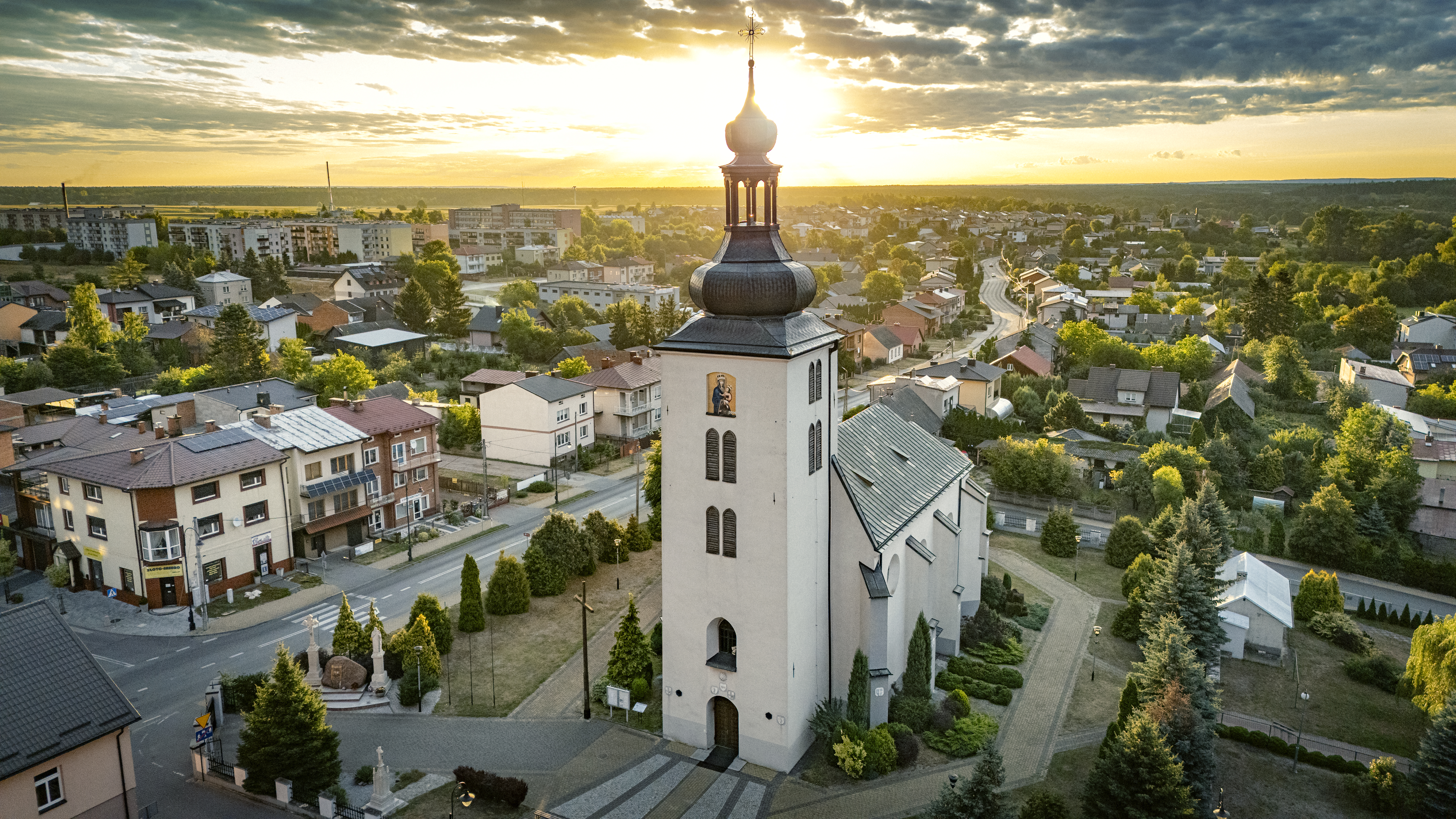
- Holy Trinity church in Lipsko

- Coat of arms

- Location within Poland
- Coordinates: 51°9′24″N 21°39′27″E
- Country: Poland
- Voivodeship: Masovian
- County: Lipsko
- Gmina: Lipsko
- First mentioned: 1589
- Town rights: 1613

Government
  - Mayor: Jacek Wielorański

Area
  - Total: 15.7 km^{2} (6.1 sq mi)

Population (2006)
  - Total: 5,826
  - Density: 371/km^{2} (961/sq mi)
- Time zone: UTC+1 (CET)
  - Summer (DST): UTC+2 (CEST)
- Postal code: 27-300
- Area code: +48 48
- Car plates: WLI
- Website: http://www.lipsko.eu

Lipsko [ˈlʲipskɔ] is a town in eastern Poland, Masovian Voivodeship. It is the capital of Lipsko County. The population is 5,895 (2004). Lipsko's coat of arms is the Dębno, which was used by previous owners of the town. It is located in the historic region of Lesser Poland.

== Geography ==
Lipsko is located on two hills, divided by the Krępianka river.

== History ==
First mention about it comes from April 1589, when the village belonged to the Krępski family. In 1613 it was granted town rights, and quickly developed, due to the location along the "oxen road", from Red Ruthenia to Greater Poland and Silesia. In 1614, Holy Trinity Church was built, founded by Lord Mikołaj Oleśnicki. Lipsko was a private town, administratively located in the Radom County in the Sandomierz Voivodeship in the Lesser Poland Province of the Kingdom of Poland, In the 16th-18th centuries Lipsko belonged to various noble families - the Wolskis, Gostomskis, Oleśnickis, Denhoffs, Sanguszkos, and Kochanowskis. The Dębno coat of arms of the Oleśnicki family remains the town's coat of arms to this day.

The town was annexed by Austria in the Third Partition of Poland in 1795. It was regained by Poles following the Austro–Polish War of 1809, and included within the short-lived Duchy of Warsaw. After the duchy's dissolution, in 1815, it fell to the Russian Partition of Poland. In 1868, as a punishment for participation of residents in the Polish January Uprising, the Russians took away Lipsko's town rights, turning it into a village (Lipsko did not become a town again until 1958). After World War I, in 1918, Poland regained independence and control of the town.

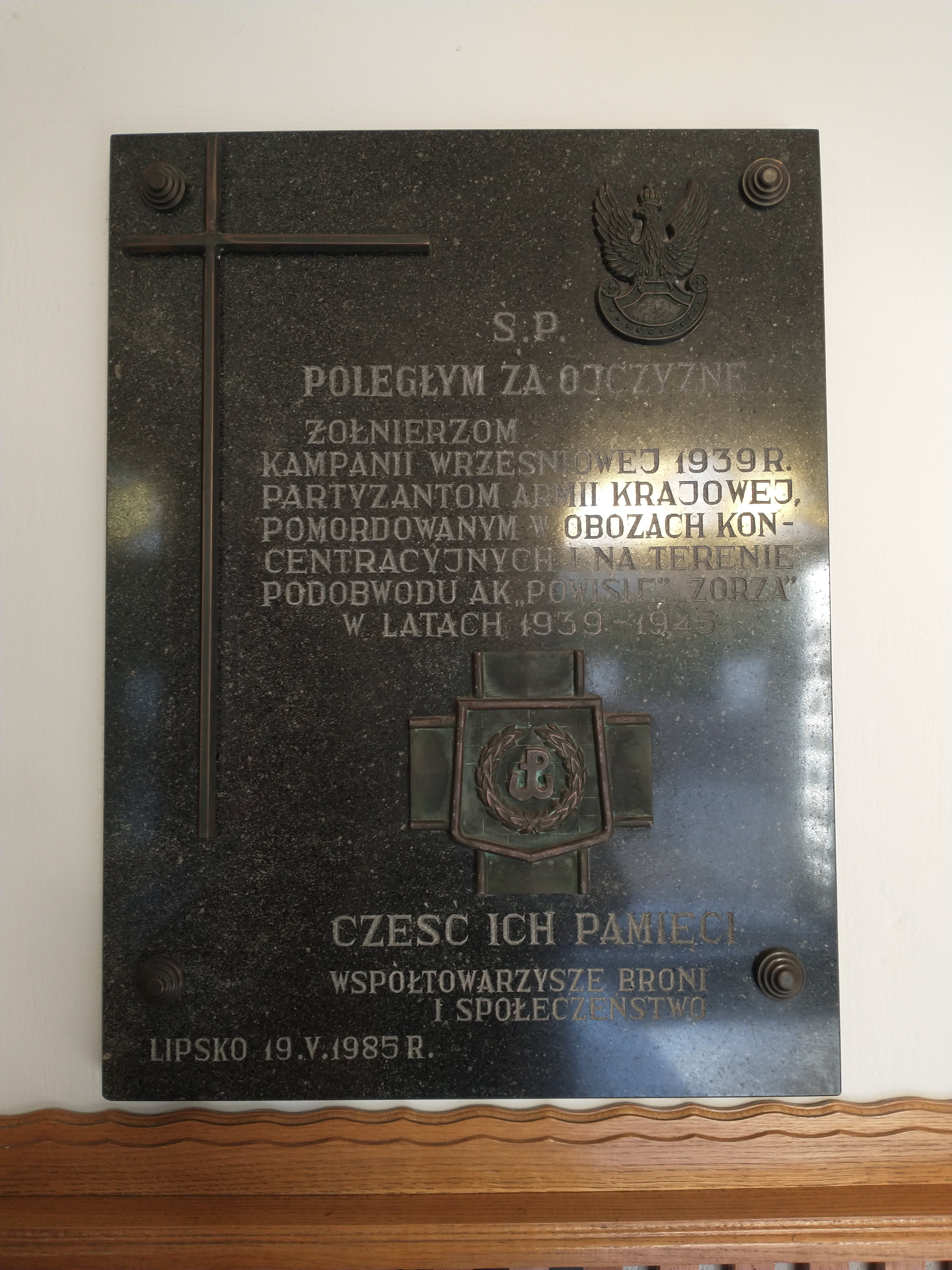
Memorial plaque to Polish soldiers and partisans killed in World War II

Following the German-Soviet invasion of Poland, which started World War II in September 1939, the town was occupied by Germany. The German occupiers committed mass murders and brutalized both the Christian Polish and Jewish population. At the beginning of the war, about 1,600 Jews lived in Lipsko, half the population. When the Germans occupied the town, on September 8, 1939, they shot several Jews, including the rabbi, and then burned alive 60 to 80 Jews in the synagogue. Later the Jewish population was forced into a ghetto and Jews from surrounding villages were brought there too. By October 1942, there were 3,600 Jews in the ghetto. Lipsko was conveniently, for the Germans, located near a railway line. Some Jews were deported to forced labour camps, but in mid October 1942, the rest of the Jewish population were rounded up by German police and Ukrainian auxiliary guards. A few escaped to hide with local Polish friends or join the partisans. Most were transported to the Tarłów ghetto and then on to the Treblinka extermination camp, where they were murdered on arrival by gassing. The number of Jewish survivors from Lipsko is unknown. Several Poles who were either born or lived and worked in Lipsko were murdered by the Russians in the Katyn massacre in 1940.

On January 1, 1956, Lipsko became the seat of a county in Kielce Voivodeship. From 1975 to 1998, it was administratively part of the Radom Voivodeship.

== Sports ==
The town is home to a sports club Powiślanka Lipsko, founded in 1964.
