= Lipsko County =

Lipsko County Powiat lipski
- County
- Flag Coat of arms

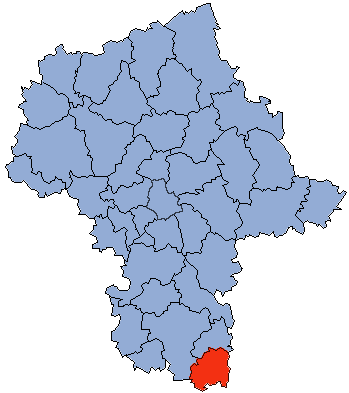
- Location within the voivodeship

- Division into gminas
- Coordinates (Lipsko): 51°9′24″N 21°39′27″E
- Country: Poland
- Voivodeship: Masovian
- Seat: Lipsko
- Gminas: Total 6: Gmina Chotcza; Gmina Ciepielów; Gmina Lipsko; Gmina Rzeczniów; Gmina Sienno; Gmina Solec nad Wisłą

Area
  - Total: 747.58 km^{2} (288.64 sq mi)

Population (2019)
  - Total: 34,028
  - Density: 45.518/km^{2} (117.89/sq mi)
  - Urban: 5,501
  - Rural: 28,527
- Car plates: WLI
- Website: www.powiatlipsko.pl

Lipsko County (Polish: powiat lipski) is a unit of territorial administration and local government (powiat) in Masovian Voivodeship, east-central Poland. It came into being on January 1, 1999, as a result of the Polish local government reforms passed in 1998. Its administrative seat is Lipsko, which lies 127 kilometres (79 mi) south of Warsaw. The only other town in this county is Solec nad Wisłą.

The county covers an area of 747.58 square kilometres (288.6 sq mi). As of 2019 its total population is 34,028, out of which the population of Lipsko is 5,501 and the rural population is 28,527.

== Neighbouring provinces ==
Lipsko County is bordered by Zwoleń County to the north, Opole County to the east, Opatów County to the south, Ostrowiec County to the south-west, Starachowice County to the west and Radom County to the north-west.

== Administrative division ==
The county is subdivided into six gminas (one urban-rural and five rural). These are listed in the following table, in descending order of population.

Gmina	Type	Area (km^{2})	Population (2019)	Seat
Gmina Lipsko	urban-rural	135.2	11,057	Lipsko
Gmina Sienno	rural	147.2	5,824	Sienno
Gmina Ciepielów	rural	135.3	5,543	Ciepielów
Gmina Solec nad Wisłą	rural	137.4	4,895	Solec nad Wisłą
Gmina Rzeczniów	rural	103.7	4,376	Rzeczniów
Gmina Chotcza	rural	88.8	2,333	Chotcza
