= National road 9 (Poland) =

National road in Poland

National Road 9
- Droga krajowa nr 9
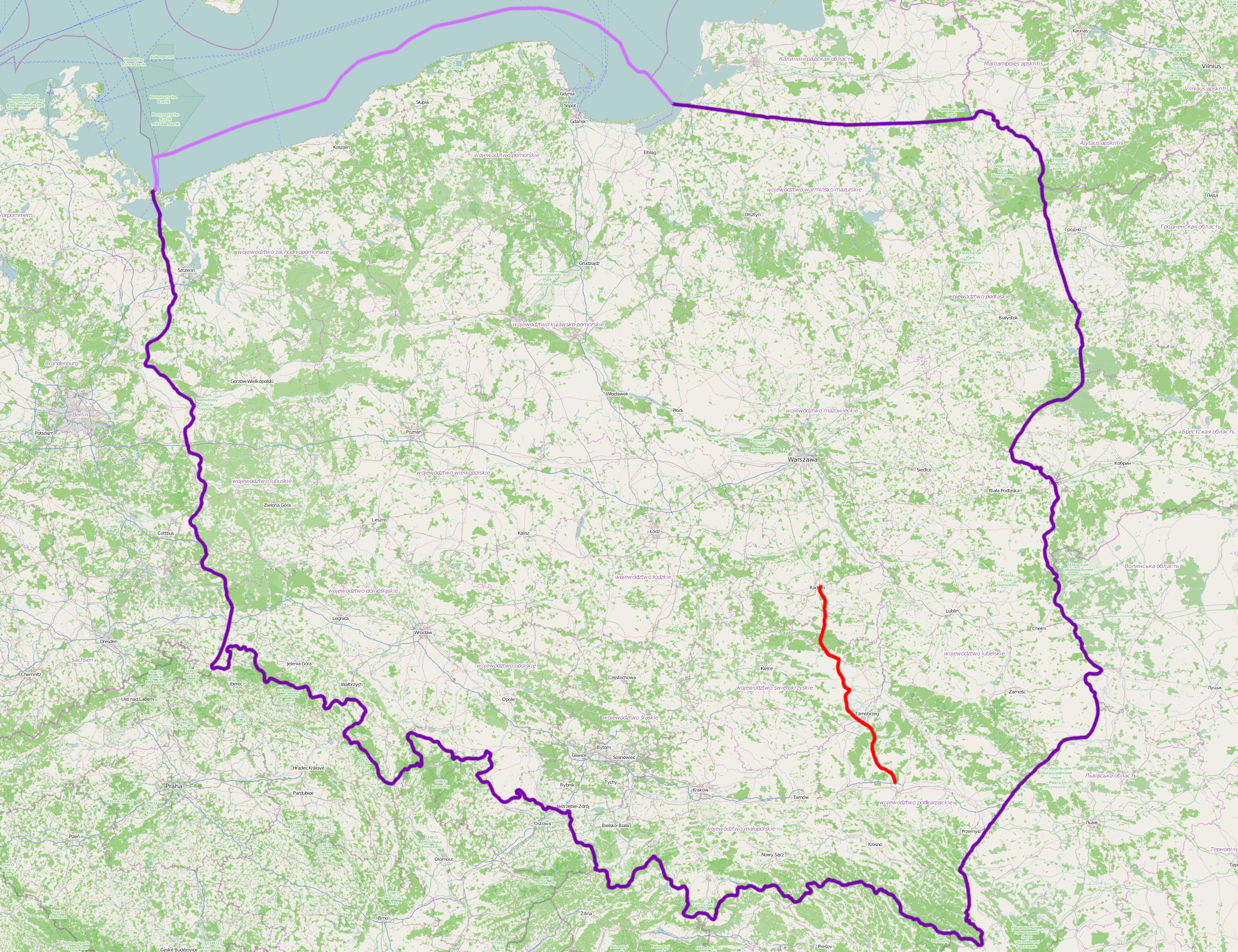
- The route of the National Road 9 Trunk road standard

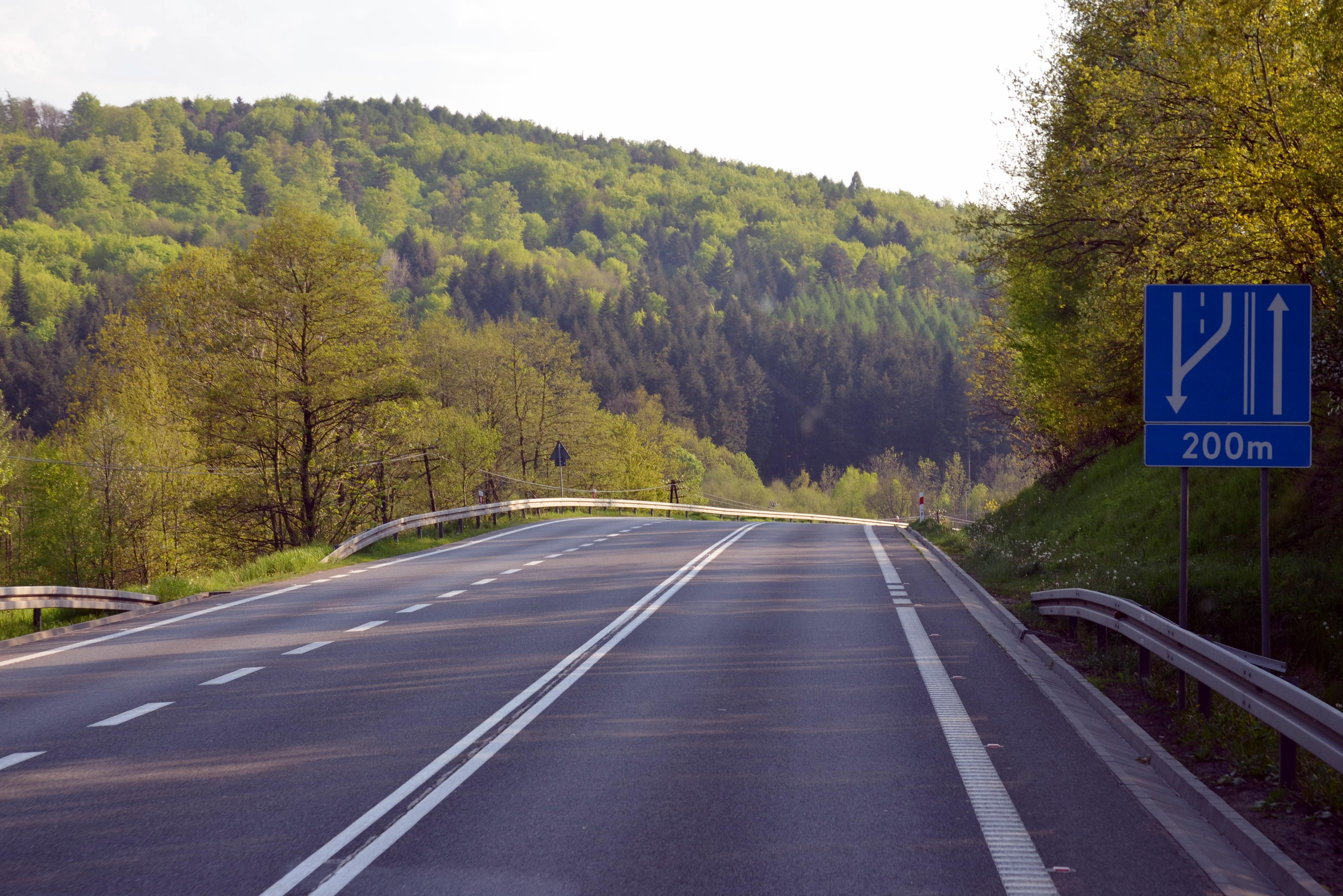
- The National Road 9 in Niebylec.

Route information
- Maintained by GDDKiA
- Length: 189 km (117 mi)
- Existed: 1986–present

Major junctions
- North end: Radom
- South end: Rzeszów

Location
- Country: Poland
- Regions: Masovian Voivodeship; Świętokrzyskie Voivodeship; Podkarpackie Voivodeship
- Major cities: Radom, Iłża, Ostrowiec Świętokrzyski, Tarnobrzeg, Rzeszów

Highway system
- National roads in Poland; Voivodeship roads
← DK 8	→ DK 10

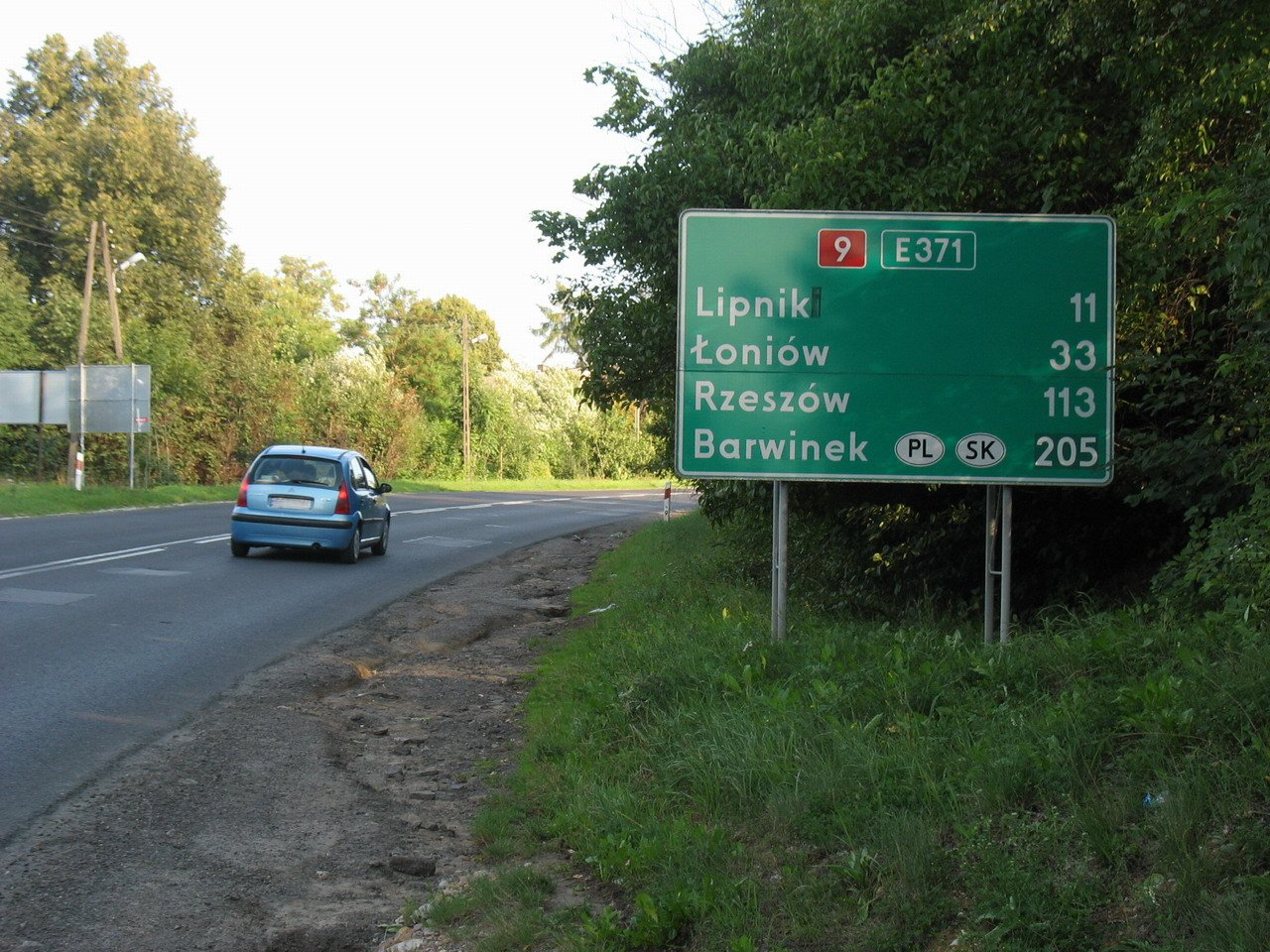
The National Road 9 from Opatów.

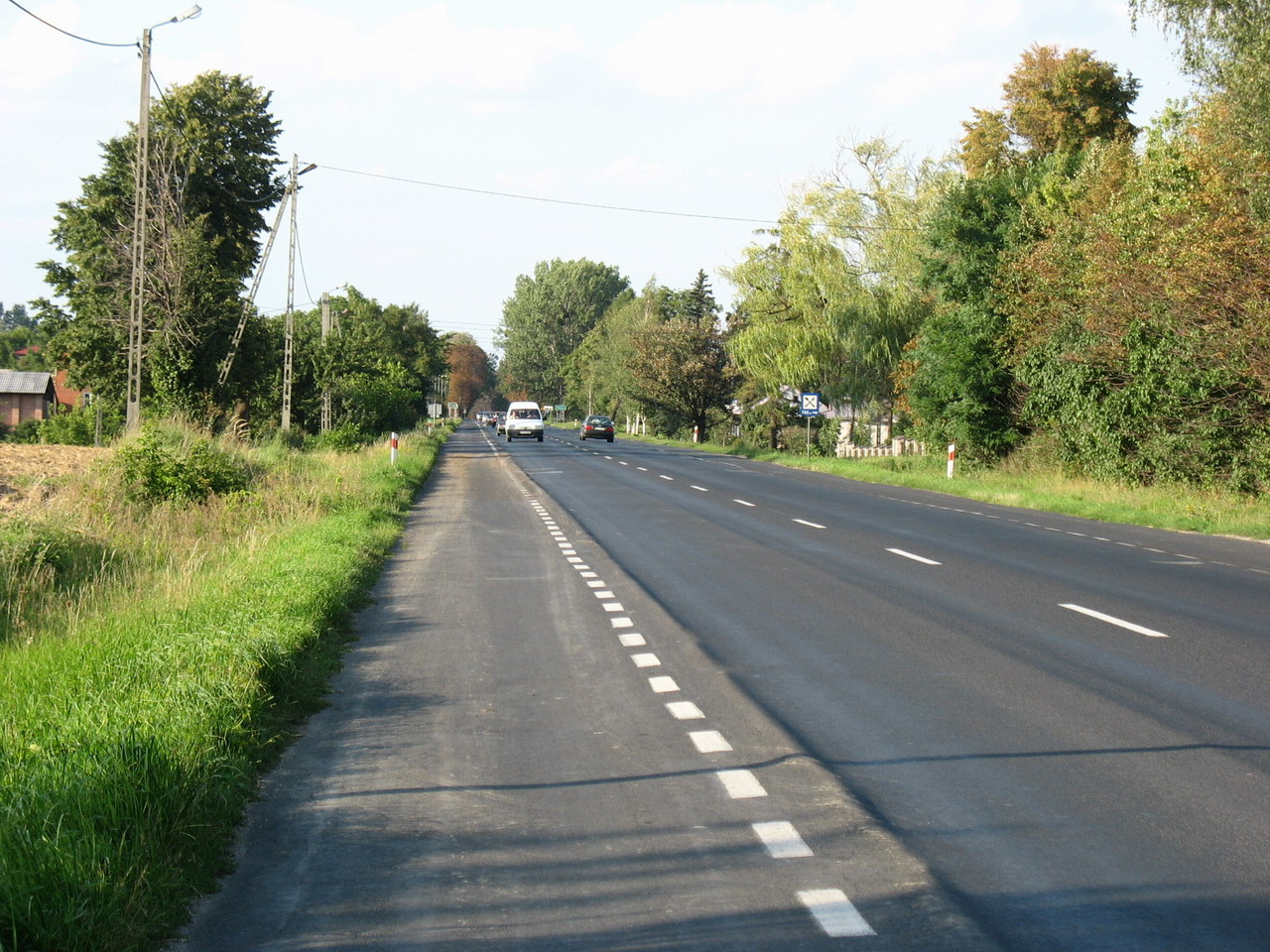
Rut on the national road 9 in Okalina. (2006)

National Road 9 (Polish: Droga krajowa 9) a route belonging to the Polish national roads network. It runs from Radom, to Rzeszów. The route is part of the international European route E371. In Radom the road shares a part with the National Road 12, and in Opatów with the National Road 74. It is the only one-digit numbered national road for which there are no plans to build an expressway or motorway.

Before 2014, road 9 continued from Rzeszów to the Slovak border in Barwinek. This section is now part of road 19.

== Important settlements along the National Road 9 ==
- Radom
- Skaryszew
- Iłża
- Ostrowiec Świętokrzyski
- Opatów
- Klimontów
- Łoniów
- Tarnobrzeg
- Nowa Dęba
- Majdan Królewski
- Cmolas
- Kolbuszowa
- Głogów Małopolski
- Rzeszów

== Route plan ==
km	Icon	Name	Crossed roads
0		Radom - NSZ Roundabout	
1		Radom - Chrobry/Mieszko Road	
2		Radom - Zbrowski/Energetyków Road	
2		Radom - Viaduct over Railway Line	
4		Roundabout Kozienickie	
4		Viaduct over the Railway Line 26	
8		Roundabout Matki Bożej Fatimskiej Square	
17		Bridge over the river Kobylanka	—
18		Skaryszew	
25		Bridge over the river Modrzewianka	—
34		Petrol station in Iłża (PKN Orlen)	—
35		Bridge over the river Iłżanka	—
35		Iłża	
52		Viaduct over the Railway Line 25 in Brody	
52		Bridge over the river Kamienna	—
56		Rudnik	
60		Bridge over the river Kamienna	—
60		Kunów - Roundabout	—
62		Kunów - Petrol station (BP)	—
64		Viaduct over the Railway Line 25 in Boksycka	
67		Ostrowiec Świętokrzyski - Bridge over the river Modła	—
67		Ostrowiec Świętokrzyski - Żeromski Road	
69		Ostrowiec Świętokrzyski - Petrol station (Statoil)	—
69		Ostrowiec Świętokrzyski - Powstania Styczniowego Roundabout	
70		Ostrowiec Świętokrzyski - Viaduct over the Railway Line 25	
70		Ostrowiec Świętokrzyski - Republiki Ostrowieckiej Roundabout	
70		Ostrowiec Świętokrzyski - Bridge over the river Szewnianka	—
71		Ostrowiec Świętokrzyski - Zygmuntówka Road	
71		Ostrowiec Świętokrzyski - Petrol station (PKN Orlen)	—
85		Opatów - Petrol station (PKN Orlen)	—
85		Opatów - Bridge over the river Opatówka	—
85		Legionów	
85		National Heritage Site Brama Warszawska	—
86		1 maja Road	
87		Petrol station (Moya)	—
87		Bridge over the river Kania	—
90		Petrol station in Okalina-Kolonia (Grupa Lotos)	—
94		Petrol station in Włostów	—
97		Lipnik	DK 77
98		Petrol station in Kurów (PKN Orlen)	—
107		Klimontów	
108		Petrol station in Klimontów (Shell)	—
113		Bridge over the river Koprzywianka	—
119		Łoniów - Roundabout	
120		Łoniów - Petrol station (PKN Orlen)	—
120		Łoniów	
124		Viaduct over Railway Line 70 in Bogoria	
127		Tarnobrzeg - Bridge in Nagnajów over the river Vistula	—
128		Tarnobrzeg - Nagnajów	
128		Tarnobrzeg - Petrol station in Nagnajów (Moya)	—
130		Viaduct over Railway Line 25 in Chmielów	
132		Bridge over the river Trześniówka	—
135		Level crossing on the Railway Line 71 in	
141		Bridge over the river Dęba	—
143		Bridge over the river Dęba	—
145		Nowa Dęba - Petrol station (PKN Orlen)	—
146		Viaduct over the Railway Line 71	
147		Nowa Dęba	
150		Majdan Królewski	
150		Viaduct over Railway Line 71	
158		Bridge over the river Werynia	—
161		Bridge over the river Przyrwa	—
165		Kolbuszowa - Roundabout	DW 875
165		Kolbuszowa	DW 875
166		Kolbuszowa - Roundabout	
171		Kolbuszowa Górna - Petrol station (Shell)	—
175		Drive under a viaduct on the Railway Line 71 in Widełka	
177		Widełka - Petrol station	—
188		Rudna Mała	
189		Roundabout Junction Węzeł Rzeszów-Północ	
