= Tarnobrzeg Voivodeship =

Former administrative division of Poland

Coordinates: 50°34′17″N 21°40′37″E

- Historical division
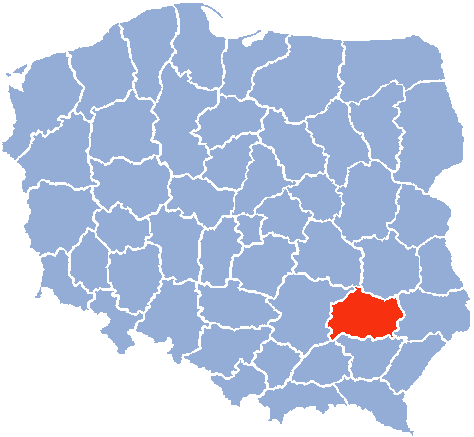
- Tarnobrzeg Voivodeship, 1975-1998

The Tarnobrzeg Voivodeship (Polish: województwo tarnobrzeskie) was a unit of administrative division and local government in Poland in years 1975-1998, superseded in parts by Subcarpathian Voivodeship, Świętokrzyskie Voivodeship and Lublin Voivodeship. Its capital city was Tarnobrzeg, although the major city in the region was Stalowa Wola.

Tarnobrzeg Voivodeship was located in the area of the Kielce-Sandomierz Upland (Wyżyna Kielecko-Sandomierska; the Sandomierska Upland, a patch of Podgórze Iłżeckie and the eastern end of the Świętokrzyskie Mountains), the flat Sandomierz Basin (the Tarnobrzeg and Biłgoraj plains) and on the edges of the Lublin Upland and Roztocze. The main rivers were the Vistula and the San. Large areas were occupied by the Sandomierz Forest and the Janów Forest.

The region was represented in football by the local giant teams of Stal Stalowa Wola and Siarka Tarnobrzeg.

== Major cities and towns (population in 1998) ==
- Stalowa Wola (71,814)
- Tarnobrzeg (51,061)
- Sandomierz (27,409)
- Staszów (17,015)
- Nisko (15,722)

== Transport ==
=== Road transport ===
- DK 9 Radom – Ostrowiec Świętokrzyski – Tarnobrzeg Voivodeship border – Sadowie – Opatów – Lipnik – Łoniów – Tarnobrzeg – Nowa Dęba – Majdan Królewski – Tarnobrzeg Voivodeship border – Rzeszów
- DK 19 Kuźnica Białostocka – Białystok – Lublin – Kraśnik – Tarnobrzeg Voivodeship border – Modliborzyce – Janów Lubelski – Nisko – Jeżowe – Tarnobrzeg Voivodeship border – Rzeszów – Barwinek
- DK 74 Walichnowy – Piotrków Trybunalski – Kielce – Tarnobrzeg Voivodeship border – Baćkowice – Opatów – Annopol – Gościeradów – Olbięcin – Tarnobrzeg Voivodeship border – Kraśnik – Tarnobrzeg Voivodeship border – Modliborzyce – Janów Lubelski – Dzwola – Tarnobrzeg Voivodeship border – Zamość – Zosin
- DK 77 Lipnik – Sandomierz – Stalowa Wola – Nisko – Rudnik nad Sanem – Kopki – Tarnobrzeg Voivodeship border – Jarosław – Przemyśl
- DK 79 Bytom – Katowice – Kraków – Tarnobrzeg Voivodeship border – Łubnice – Połaniec – Osiek – Łoniów – Sandomierz – Ożarów – Tarłów – Czekarzewice – Tarnobrzeg Voivodeship border – Warsaw

== See also ==
- Voivodeships of Poland
