= Czerników =

Czerników may refer to the following places in Poland:

- Czerników, Łódź Voivodeship
- Czerników, West Pomeranian Voivodeship
- Czerników Karski
- Czerników Opatowski
