= Leszczków =

- Village
- Location within Poland
- Coordinates: 50°44′27″N 21°29′5″E
- Country: Poland
- Voivodeship: Świętokrzyskie
- County: Opatów
- Gmina: Lipnik
- Population: 450

Leszczków [ˈlɛʂt͡ʂkuf] is a village in the administrative district of Gmina Lipnik, within Opatów County, Świętokrzyskie Voivodeship, in south-central Poland. It lies approximately 2 km (1 mi) north of Lipnik, 9 km (6 mi) south-east of Opatów, and 64 km (40 mi) east of the regional capital Kielce.
