= Żurawniki, Opatów County =

Żurawniki
- Village
- Location within Poland
- Coordinates: 50°45′9″N 21°30′16″E
- Country: Poland
- Voivodeship: Świętokrzyskie
- County: Opatów
- Gmina: Lipnik
- Population: 120

Żurawniki [ʐuravˈniki] is a village in the administrative district of Gmina Lipnik, within Opatów County, Świętokrzyskie Voivodeship, in south-central Poland. It lies approximately 3 km (2 mi) north-east of Lipnik, 9 km (6 mi) south-east of Opatów, and 65 km (40 mi) east of the regional capital Kielce.
