= Malżyn =

- Village
- Location within Poland
- Coordinates: 50°43′17″N 21°26′29″E
- Country: Poland
- Voivodeship: Świętokrzyskie
- County: Opatów
- Gmina: Lipnik
- Population: 230

Malżyn [ˈmalʐɨn] is a village in the administrative district of Gmina Lipnik, within Opatów County, Świętokrzyskie Voivodeship, in south-central Poland. It lies approximately 4 km (2 mi) west of Lipnik, 10 km (6 mi) south of Opatów, and 61 km (38 mi) east of the regional capital Kielce.
