= Słabuszewice =

- Village
- Location within Poland
- Coordinates: 50°45′21″N 21°32′44″E
- Country: Poland
- Voivodeship: Świętokrzyskie
- County: Opatów
- Gmina: Lipnik
- Population: 380

Słabuszewice [swabuʂɛˈvit͡sɛ] is a village in the administrative district of Gmina Lipnik, within Opatów County, Świętokrzyskie Voivodeship, in south-central Poland. It lies approximately 5 km (3 mi) north-east of Lipnik, 11 km (7 mi) south-east of Opatów, and 67 km (42 mi) east of the regional capital Kielce.
