= Gołębiów =

Gołębiów may refer to the following places:

- Gołębiów, Grójec County in Masovian Voivodeship (east-central Poland)
- Gołębiów, Lipsko County in Masovian Voivodeship (east-central Poland)
- Gołębiów, Świętokrzyskie Voivodeship (south-central Poland)
