= Męczennice =

- Village
- Location within Poland
- Coordinates: 50°45′47″N 21°32′4″E
- Country: Poland
- Voivodeship: Świętokrzyskie
- County: Opatów
- Gmina: Lipnik
- Population: 140

Męczennice [mɛnt͡ʂɛnˈnit͡sɛ] is a village in the administrative district of Gmina Lipnik, within Opatów County, Świętokrzyskie Voivodeship, in south-central Poland. It lies approximately 5 km (3 mi) north-east of Lipnik, 10 km (6 mi) south-east of Opatów, and 66 km (41 mi) east of the regional capital Kielce.
