= Ublinek =

- Village
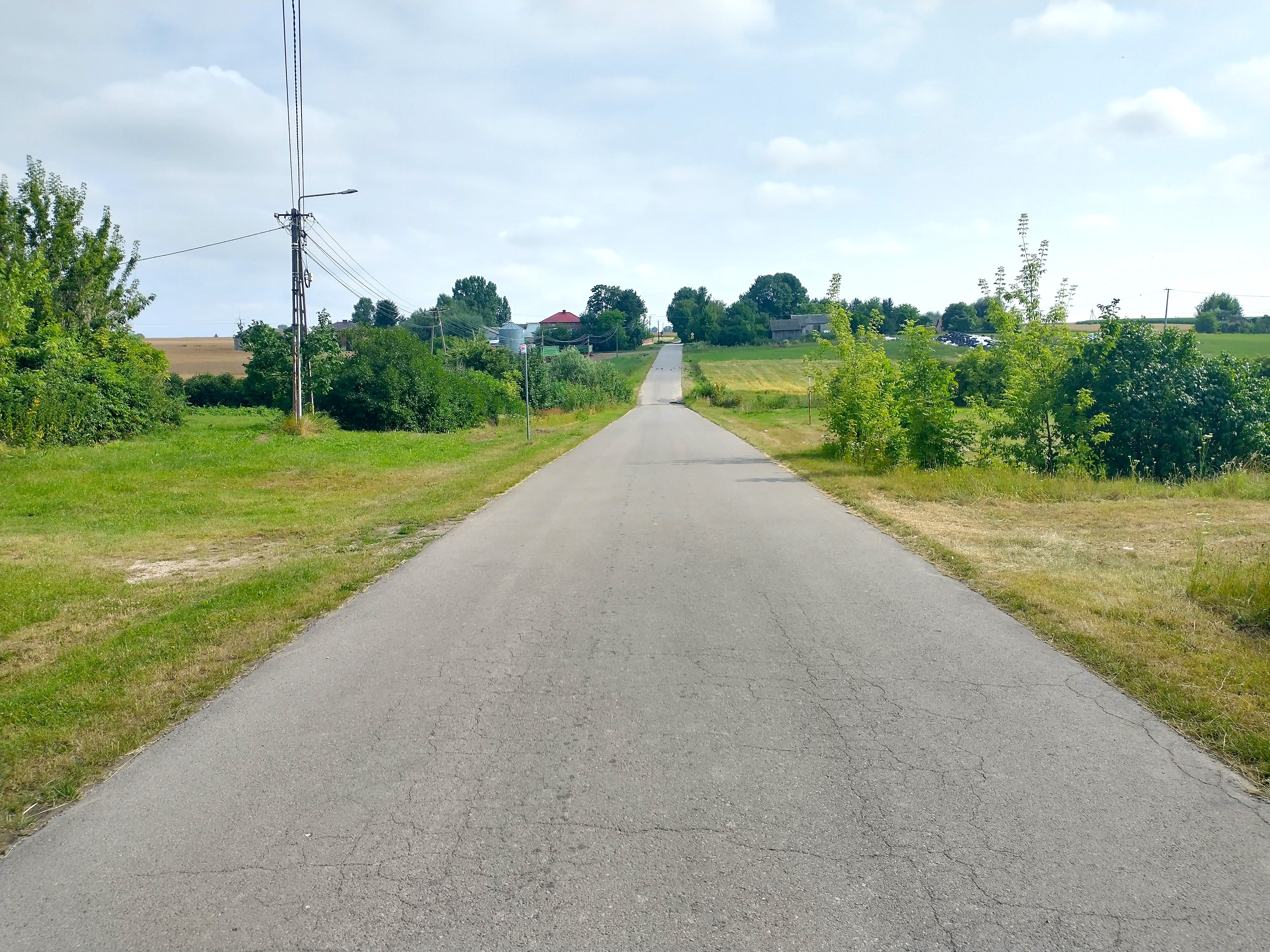

- Location within Poland
- Coordinates: 50°44′38″N 21°23′49″E
- Country: Poland
- Voivodeship: Świętokrzyskie
- County: Opatów
- Gmina: Lipnik
- Population: 270

Ublinek [uˈblinɛk] is a village in the administrative district of Gmina Lipnik, within Opatów County, Świętokrzyskie Voivodeship, in south-central Poland. It lies approximately 7 km (4 mi) west of Lipnik, 8 km (5 mi) south of Opatów, and 58 km (36 mi) east of the regional capital Kielce.

== History ==
The village has ancient roots, and many noble families, bearing the Ostoja coat of arms, lived in its territory.
