= Słoptów =

- Village
- Location within Poland
- Coordinates: 50°42′51″N 21°27′27″E
- Country: Poland
- Voivodeship: Świętokrzyskie
- County: Opatów
- Gmina: Lipnik
- Population: 200

Słoptów [ˈswɔptuf] is a village in the administrative district of Gmina Lipnik, within Opatów County, Świętokrzyskie Voivodeship, in south-central Poland. It lies approximately 3 km (2 mi) south-west of Lipnik, 11 km (7 mi) south of Opatów, and 63 km (39 mi) east of the regional capital Kielce.
