= Jurkowice =

Jurkowice may refer to the following places:

- Jurkowice, Pomeranian Voivodeship (north Poland)
- Jurkowice, Opatów County in Świętokrzyskie Voivodeship (south-central Poland)
- Jurkowice, Staszów County in Świętokrzyskie Voivodeship (south-central Poland)
