= Swojków =

Swojków may refer to the following places in Poland:

- Swojków, Lower Silesian Voivodeship (south-west Poland)
- Swojków, Świętokrzyskie Voivodeship (south-central Poland)
