= Adamów, Gmina Lipnik =

Adamów
- Village
- Location within Poland
- Coordinates: 50°46′39″N 21°31′26″E
- Country: Poland
- Voivodeship: Świętokrzyskie
- County: Opatów
- Gmina: Lipnik
- Population: 80

Adamów [aˈdamuf] is a village in the administrative district of Gmina Lipnik, within Opatów County, Świętokrzyskie Voivodeship, in south-central Poland. It lies approximately 6 km (4 mi) north-east of Lipnik, 8 km (5 mi) south-east of Opatów, and 65 km (40 mi) east of the regional capital Kielce.
