= Strzyżowice =

Strzyżowice may refer to the following places:

- Strzyżowice, Lublin Voivodeship (east Poland)
- Strzyżowice, Silesian Voivodeship (south Poland)
- Strzyżowice, Świętokrzyskie Voivodeship (south-central Poland)
