= Grocholice =

Grocholice may refer to the following places:

- Grocholice, Poddębice County in Łódź Voivodeship (central Poland)
- Grocholice, Gmina Lipnik in Świętokrzyskie Voivodeship (south-central Poland)
- Grocholice, Gmina Sadowie in Świętokrzyskie Voivodeship (south-central Poland)
