= Rosochy =

Rosochy may refer to the following places:

- Rosochy, Kuyavian-Pomeranian Voivodeship (north-central Poland)
- Rosochy, Masovian Voivodeship (east-central Poland)
- Rosochy, Świętokrzyskie Voivodeship (south-central Poland)
- Rosochy, Greater Poland Voivodeship (west-central Poland)
- Rosochy, Opole Voivodeship (south-west Poland)
- Rosochy, Wejherowo County in Pomeranian Voivodeship (north Poland)
