= Usarzów =

- Village
- Location within Poland
- Coordinates: 50°42′27″N 21°31′18″E
- Country: Poland
- Voivodeship: Świętokrzyskie
- County: Opatów
- Gmina: Lipnik
- Population: 410

Usarzów [uˈsaʐuf] is a village in the administrative district of Gmina Lipnik, within Opatów County, Świętokrzyskie Voivodeship, in south-central Poland. It lies approximately 4 km (2 mi) south-east of Lipnik, 13 km (8 mi) south-east of Opatów, and 67 km (42 mi) east of the regional capital Kielce.
