= Kaczyce =

Kaczyce may refer to the following places in Poland:

- Kaczyce, Silesian Voivodeship (south Poland)
- Kaczyce, Lower Silesian Voivodeship (south-west Poland)
- Kaczyce, Świętokrzyskie Voivodeship (south-central Poland)
