= Kobylany =

Kobylany may refer to the following places:

- Kobylany, Lesser Poland Voivodeship (south Poland)
- Kobylany, Lublin Voivodeship (east Poland)
- Kobylany, Subcarpathian Voivodeship (south-east Poland)
- Kobylany, Świętokrzyskie Voivodeship (south-central Poland)
- Kobylany, Łosice County in Masovian Voivodeship (east-central Poland)
- Kobylany, Radom County in Masovian Voivodeship (east-central Poland)
