= Łownica =

- Village
- Location within Poland
- Coordinates: 50°42′16″N 21°25′40″E
- Country: Poland
- Voivodeship: Świętokrzyskie
- County: Opatów
- Gmina: Lipnik
- Population: 220

Łownica [wɔvˈnit͡sa] is a village in the administrative district of Gmina Lipnik, within Opatów County, Świętokrzyskie Voivodeship, in south-central Poland. It lies approximately 6 km (4 mi) south-west of Lipnik, 12 km (7 mi) south of Opatów, and 61 km (38 mi) east of the regional capital Kielce.
