= Kochów =

Kochów may refer to the following places in Poland:

- Kochów, Świętokrzyskie Voivodeship (south-central Poland)
- Kochów, Masovian Voivodeship (east-central Poland)
