= Malice Kościelne =

- Village
- Location within Poland
- Coordinates: 50°46′9″N 21°31′2″E
- Country: Poland
- Voivodeship: Świętokrzyskie
- County: Opatów
- Gmina: Lipnik
- Population: 160

Malice Kościelne [maˈlit͡sɛ kɔɕˈt͡ɕɛlnɛ] is a village in the administrative district of Gmina Lipnik, within Opatów County, Świętokrzyskie Voivodeship, in south-central Poland. It lies approximately 5 km (3 mi) north-east of Lipnik, 8 km (5 mi) south-east of Opatów, and 65 km (40 mi) east of the regional capital Kielce.
