= Studzianki, Świętokrzyskie Voivodeship =

Studzianki
- Village
- Location within Poland
- Coordinates: 50°46′1″N 21°33′43″E
- Country: Poland
- Voivodeship: Świętokrzyskie
- County: Opatów
- Gmina: Lipnik
- Population: 110

Studzianki [stuˈd͡ʑaŋki] is a village in the administrative district of Gmina Lipnik, within Opatów County, Świętokrzyskie Voivodeship, in south-central Poland. It lies approximately 7 km (4 mi) north-east of Lipnik, 11 km (7 mi) south-east of Opatów, and 68 km (42 mi) east of the regional capital Kielce.
