= Międzygórz =

- Village
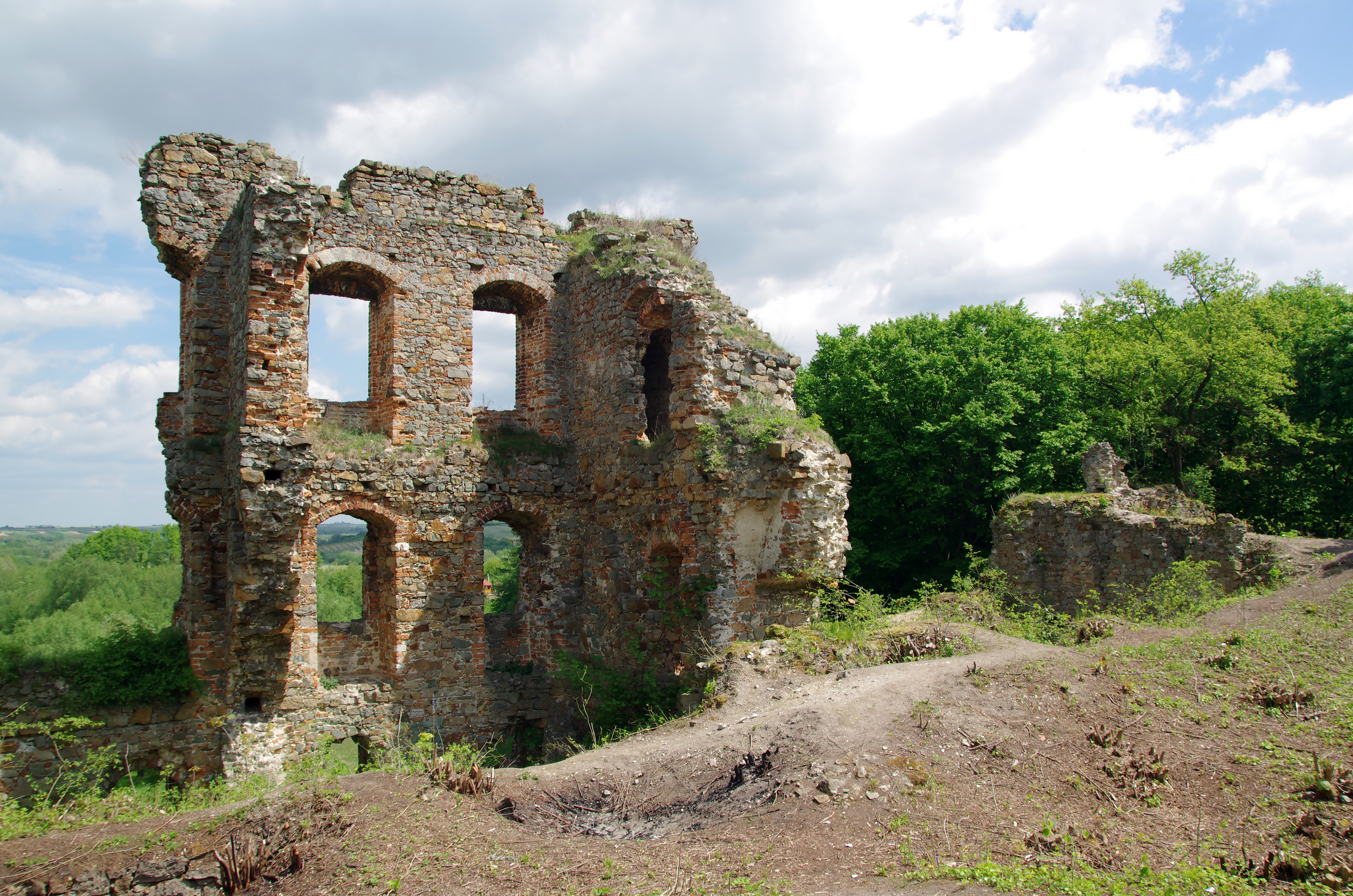
- Castle ruins

- Location within Poland
- Coordinates: 50°44′21″N 21°32′22″E
- Country: Poland
- Voivodeship: Świętokrzyskie
- County: Opatów
- Gmina: Lipnik
- Population: 300

Międzygórz [mjɛnˈd͡zɨɡuʂ] is a village in the administrative district of Gmina Lipnik, within Opatów County, Świętokrzyskie Voivodeship, in south-central Poland. It lies approximately 4 km (2 mi) east of Lipnik, 11 km (7 mi) south-east of Opatów, and 67 km (42 mi) east of the regional capital Kielce.
