= Jałowęsy =

- Village
- Location within Poland
- Coordinates: 50°48′27″N 21°21′47″E
- Country: Poland
- Voivodeship: Świętokrzyskie
- County: Opatów
- Gmina: Opatów
- Population: 450

Jałowęsy [jawɔˈvɛ̃sɨ] is a village in the administrative district of Gmina Opatów, within Opatów County, Świętokrzyskie Voivodeship, in south-central Poland. It lies approximately 5 km (3 mi) west of Opatów and 54 km (34 mi) east of the regional capital Kielce. From 1975 to 1998, the town was part of the Tarnobrzeg Voivodeship.

== Etymology ==
The name of Jałowęsy evolved over the centuries. Earliest mentions make note a village called Ialovans; this then evolved into Ialowaszy by 1578. Other names include Jalowansz, Jalowansi, Jałowansy, Jalowąssy, Ialowązy, Yallowassy and Jałowęty. These names are derived from the personal name Jałowąs, which means a man with little or no facial hair.

== History ==
The earliest mention of the town was made in 1328, in a reference to a town called Ialovans belonging to the estate of the Bishop of Lubuskie. According to historian Jan Długosz, Jalowesy consisted of 21 łan during the 15th century, and tithed the local Bishop accordingly. Starting in 1578, the town was referred to as Ialowaszy. The 1629 census indicates that Prince Władysław Dominik Zasławski was lord at that time. In 1827, the village consisted of 27 houses; by the end of the 19th century, it had 48.
