= Karwów, Świętokrzyskie Voivodeship =

Karwów
- Village
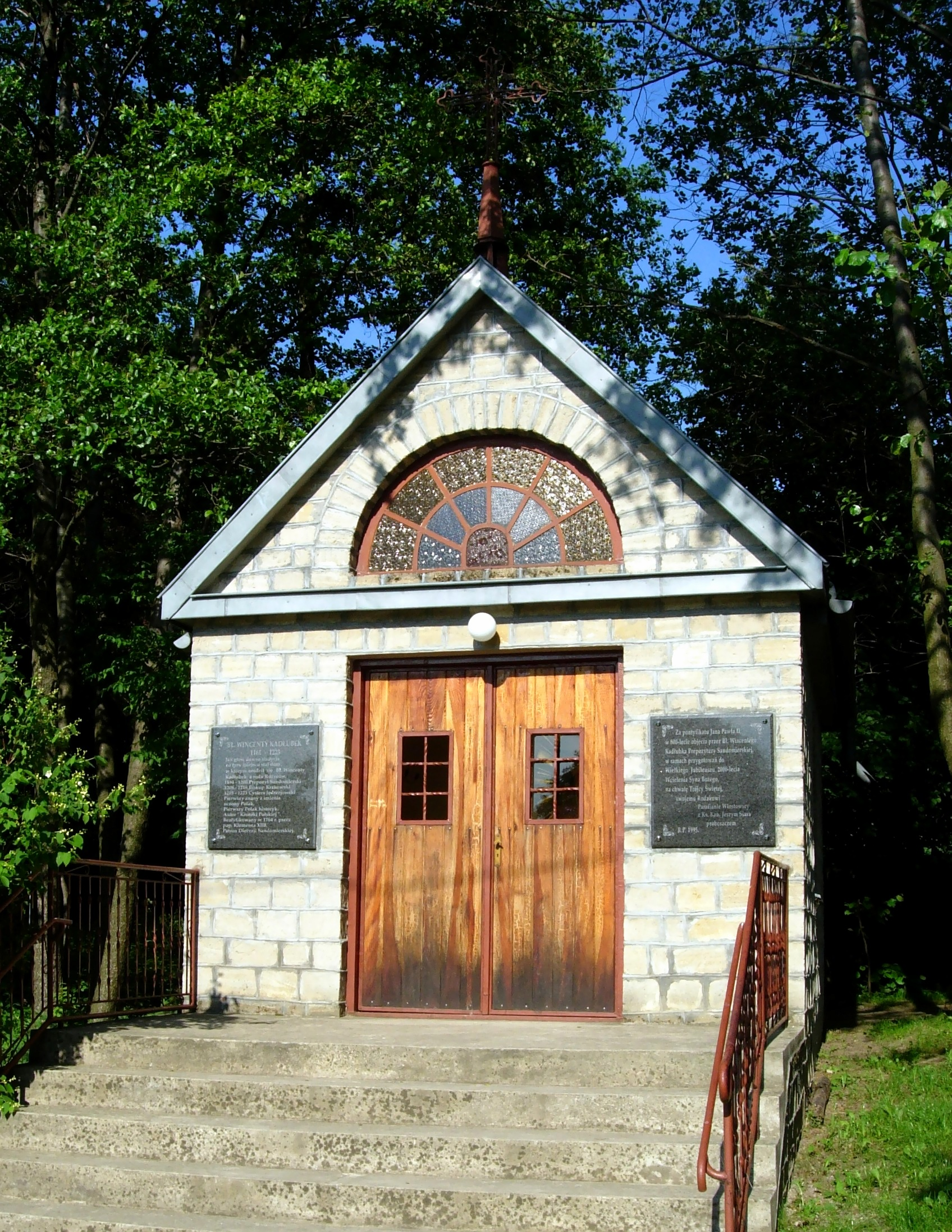
- Chapel

- Location within Poland
- Coordinates: 50°46′23″N 21°28′8″E
- Country: Poland
- Voivodeship: Świętokrzyskie
- County: Opatów
- Gmina: Opatów

Karwów [ˈkarvuf] is a village in the administrative district of Gmina Opatów, within Opatów County, Świętokrzyskie Voivodeship, in south-central Poland. It lies approximately 5 km (3 mi) south-east of Opatów and 62 km (39 mi) east of the regional capital Kielce.
