= Tudorów =

- Village
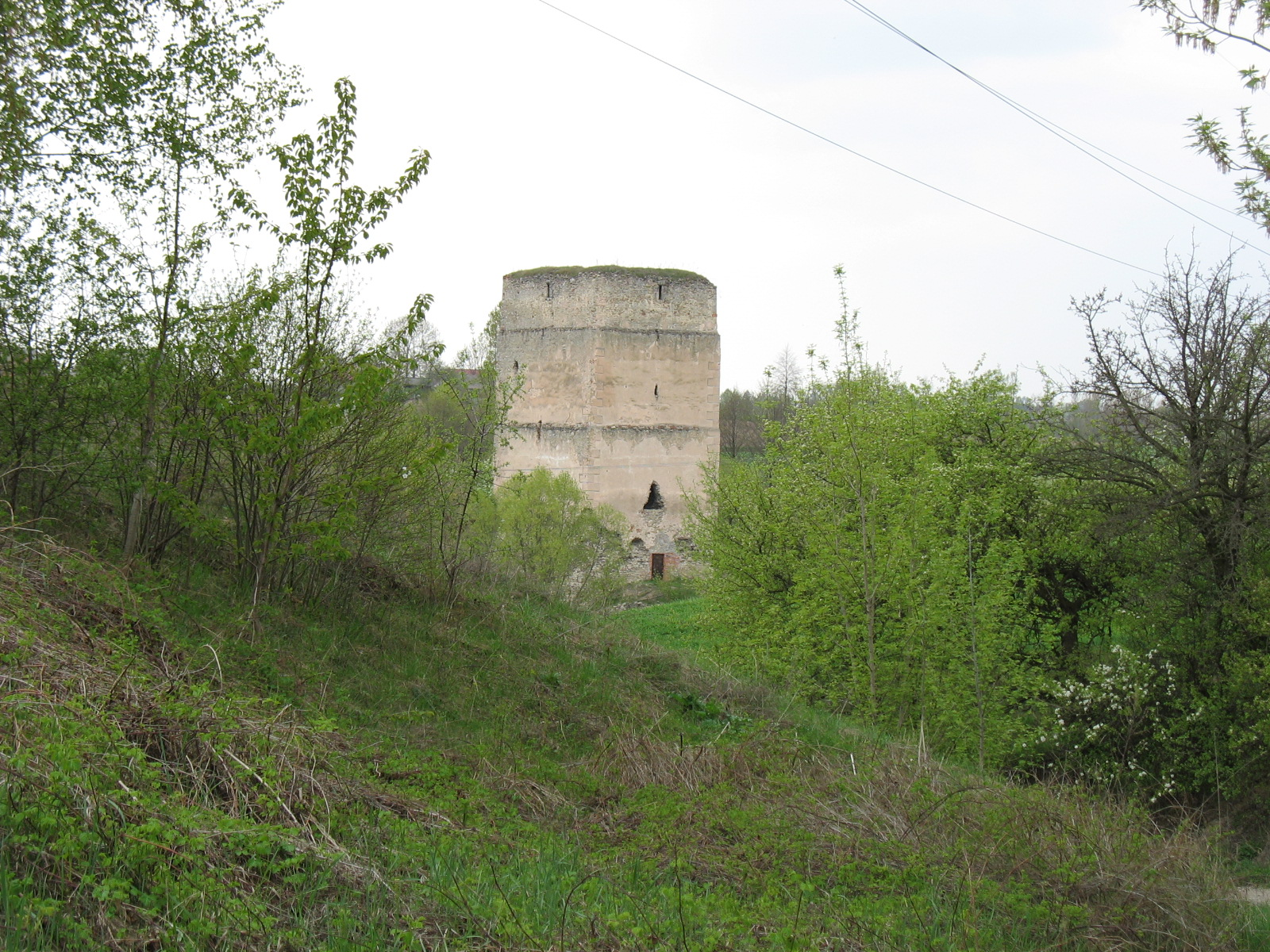
- Castle ruins

- Location within Poland
- Coordinates: 50°46′5″N 21°27′9″E
- Country: Poland
- Voivodeship: Świętokrzyskie
- County: Opatów
- Gmina: Opatów
- Population: 150

Tudorów [tuˈdɔruf] is a village in the administrative district of Gmina Opatów, within Opatów County, Świętokrzyskie Voivodeship, in south-central Poland. It lies approximately 5 km (3 mi) south-east of Opatów and 61 km (38 mi) east of the regional capital Kielce.
