= Kornacice =

- Village
- Location within Poland
- Coordinates: 50°49′42″N 21°25′44″E
- Country: Poland
- Voivodeship: Świętokrzyskie
- County: Opatów
- Gmina: Opatów
- Population: 190

Kornacice [kɔrnaˈt͡ɕit͡sɛ] is a village in the administrative district of Gmina Opatów, within Opatów County, Świętokrzyskie Voivodeship, in south-central Poland. It lies approximately 3 km (2 mi) north of Opatów and 58 km (36 mi) east of the regional capital Kielce.
