= European route E371 =

Road in trans-European E-road network

E371

Route information
- Length: 361 km (224 mi)

Major junctions
- From: Radom (Poland)
- To: Prešov (Slovakia)

Location
- Countries: Poland; Slovakia

Highway system
- International E-road network; A Class; B Class

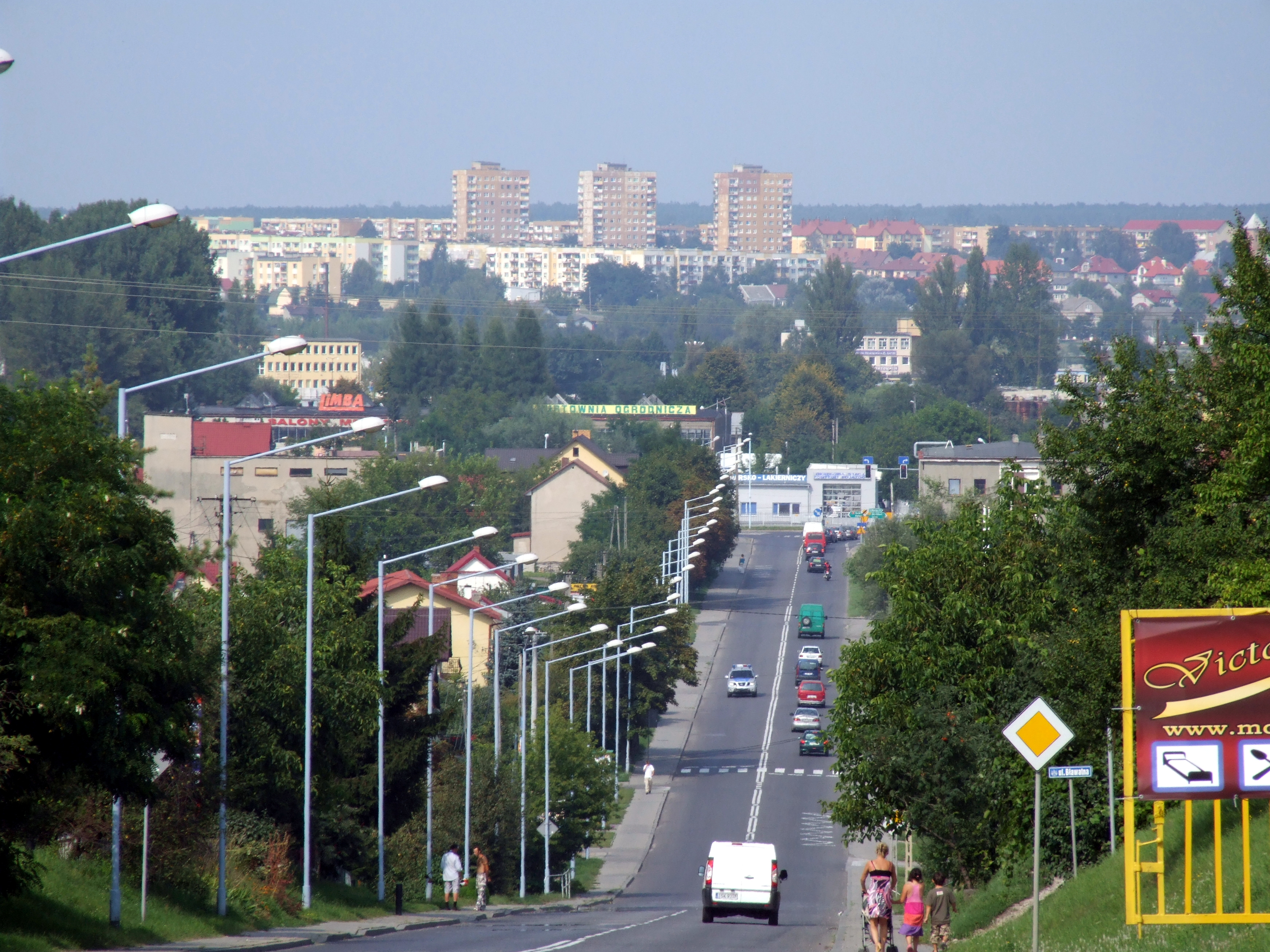
European route E 371 in Ostrowiec Świętokrzyski (Opatowska Street), Poland

The E 371 is part of the United Nations international E-road network. Approximately 358 kilometers (222 mi) long, it runs from Radom, Poland south to Prešov, Slovakia.

== Route ==
- Poland
  - DK 9: Radom – Iłża – Ostrowiec Świętokrzyski – Opatów – Tarnobrzeg – Rzeszów ( E40)
  - A 4 / S 19: Rzeszów ( E40)
  - S 19: Rzeszów
  - DK 19: Rzeszów – Miejsce Piastowe – Barwinek
- Slovakia
  - I/21: Vyšný Komárnik – Svidník – Giraltovce – Lipníky
  - I/18: Lipníky – Prešov
