= Jagnin =

- Village
- Location within Poland
- Coordinates: 50°45′35″N 21°23′38″E
- Country: Poland
- Voivodeship: Świętokrzyskie
- County: Opatów
- Gmina: Opatów

Jagnin [ˈjaɡnin] is a village in the administrative district of Gmina Opatów, within Opatów County, Świętokrzyskie Voivodeship, in south-central Poland. It lies approximately 6 km (4 mi) south-west of Opatów and 57 km (35 mi) east of the regional capital Kielce.
