= Tomaszów, Gmina Opatów =

Tomaszów
- Village
- Location within Poland
- Coordinates: 50°48′19″N 21°23′10″E
- Country: Poland
- Voivodeship: Świętokrzyskie
- County: Opatów
- Gmina: Opatów
- Population: 160

Tomaszów [tɔˈmaʂuf] is a village in the administrative district of Gmina Opatów, within Opatów County, Świętokrzyskie Voivodeship, in south-central Poland. It lies approximately 3 km (2 mi) west of Opatów and 55 km (34 mi) east of the regional capital Kielce.
