= Brzezie, Opatów County =

Brzezie
- Village
- Location within Poland
- Coordinates: 50°48′34″N 21°28′4″E
- Country: Poland
- Voivodeship: Świętokrzyskie
- County: Opatów
- Gmina: Opatów
- Population: 340

Brzezie [ˈbʐɛʑɛ] is a village in the administrative district of Gmina Opatów, within Opatów County, Świętokrzyskie Voivodeship, in south-central Poland. It lies approximately 4 km (2 mi) east of Opatów and 61 km (38 mi) east of the regional capital Kielce.
