= Kurów, Świętokrzyskie Voivodeship =

Kurów
- Village
- Location within Poland
- Coordinates: 50°43′17″N 21°29′34″E
- Country: Poland
- Voivodeship: Świętokrzyskie
- County: Opatów
- Gmina: Lipnik
- Population: 490

Kurów [ˈkuruf] is a village in the administrative district of Gmina Lipnik, within Opatów County, Świętokrzyskie Voivodeship, in south-central Poland. It lies approximately 1 km (1 mi) south of Lipnik, 11 km (7 mi) south-east of Opatów, and 65 km (40 mi) east of the regional capital Kielce.
