= National road 19 (Poland) =

National road in Poland

National Road 19
- Droga krajowa nr 19
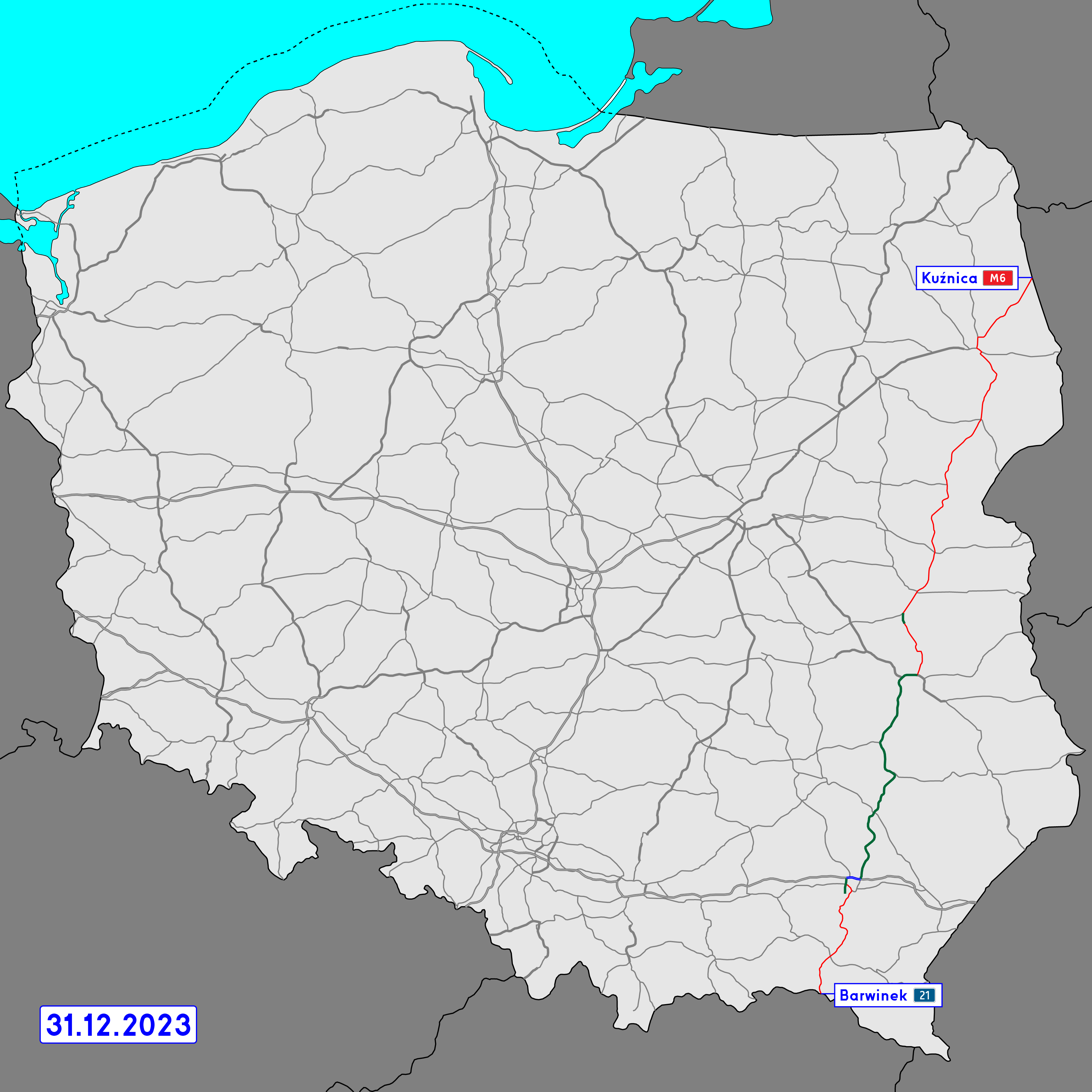

Route information
- Part of E371
- Maintained by GDDKiA
- Length: 592 km (368 mi)
- Existed: 1986–present

Major junctions
- From: Kuźnica (PL-BY border)
- To: Barwinek (PL-SK border)

Location
- Country: Poland
- Regions: Podlaskie Voivodeship; Masovian Voivodeship; Lublin Voivodeship; Podkarpackie Voivodeship
- Major cities: Białystok, Lublin, Rzeszów

Highway system
- National roads in Poland; Voivodeship roads
← DK 18	→ DK 20

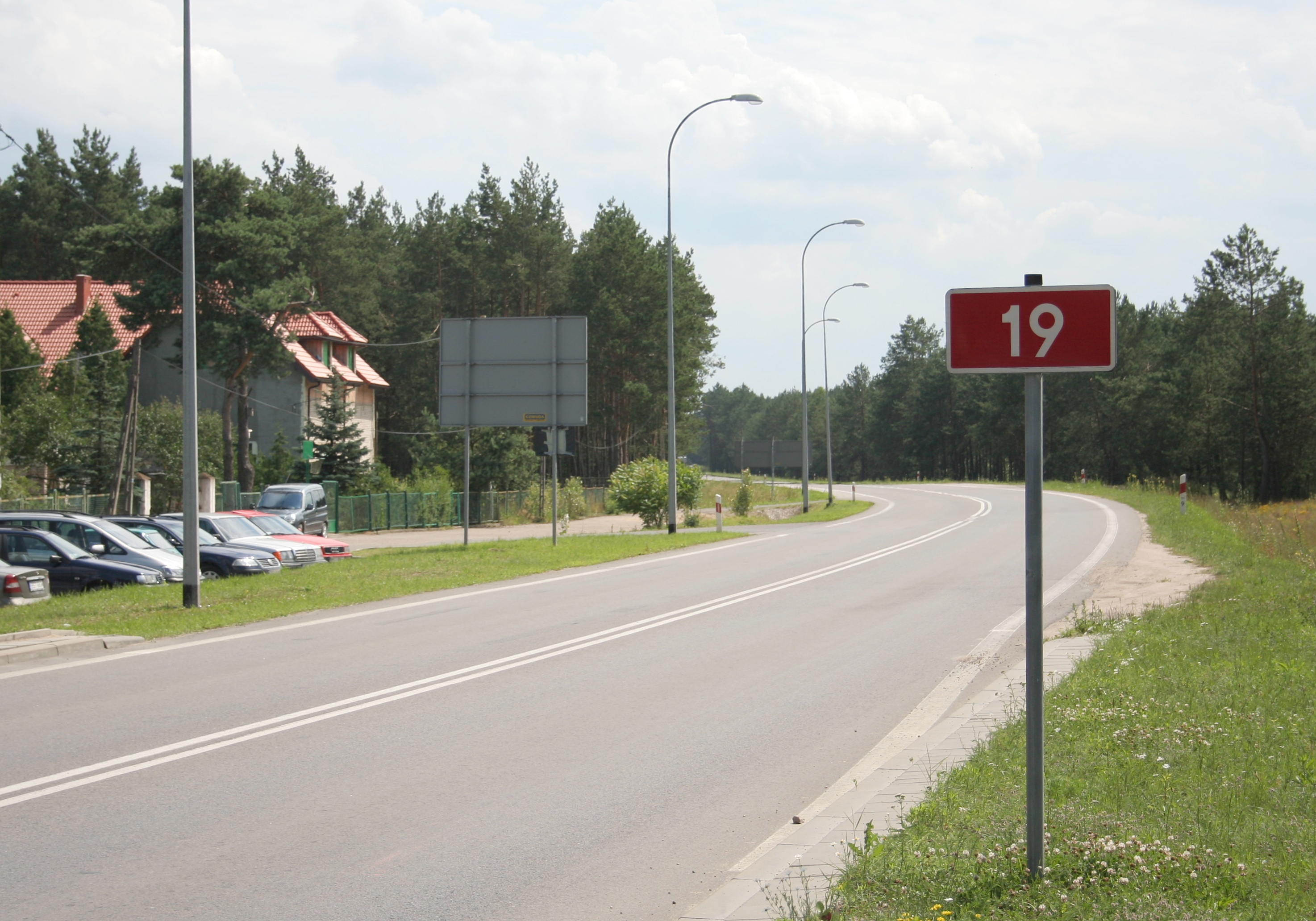
Road 19 in Siemiatycze

National road 19 (Polish: Droga krajowa nr 19) is part of the Polish national road network. The highway connects the north-eastern and southern regions of Poland, running from Kuźnica at the Belarus border to Barwinek at the Slovak border, traversing through the Podlaskie, Masovian, Lublin and Podkarpackie voivodeships. National road 19 is part of European highway E371. It is soon to be mostly accompanied by the new S19 Expressway

Before 1986, the section between Lublin and Rzeszów was road 26, and between Lublin and Radzyń Podlaski was road 24. The remaining length of the route did not have the status of national road. After renumbering of roads, route 19 near Białystok led in the direction of Augustów, Suwałki, to the border in Budzisko (today's road 8 E67). Later changed course from Białystok towards Sokółka to the border in Kuźnica (former road 18). In 2014 road 19 was extended from Rzeszów to the Slovak border at Barwinek, replacing a section of road 9.

== Major cities and towns along the route ==
- Kuźnica (border with Belarus)
- Sokółka
- Sochonie (road 8)
- Białystok (road 8, 65)
- Bielsk Podlaski (road 66)
- Siemiatycze (road 62)
- Łosice
- Międzyrzec Podlaski (road 2)
- Radzyń Podlaski (road 63)
- Kock (road 48)
- Lublin (S12, S17)
- Kraśnik (road 74)
- Janów Lubelski (road 74)
- Nisko (road 77)
- Rzeszów (road 9, road 94)
- Dukla
- Barwinek (border with Slovakia)
