= Swojków, Świętokrzyskie Voivodeship =

Swojków
- Village
- Location within Poland
- Coordinates: 50°43′33″N 21°25′41″E
- Country: Poland
- Voivodeship: Świętokrzyskie
- County: Opatów
- Gmina: Lipnik
- Population: 100

Swojków [ˈsfɔi̯kuf] is a village in the administrative district of Gmina Lipnik, within Opatów County, Świętokrzyskie Voivodeship, in south-central Poland. It lies approximately 5 km (3 mi) west of Lipnik, 9 km (6 mi) south of Opatów, and 60 km (37 mi) east of the regional capital Kielce.
