= Balbinów =

- Village
- Location within Poland
- Coordinates: 50°48′31″N 21°30′9″E
- Country: Poland
- Voivodeship: Świętokrzyskie
- County: Opatów
- Gmina: Opatów
- Population: 100

Balbinów [balˈbinuf] is a village in the administrative district of Gmina Opatów, within Opatów County, Świętokrzyskie Voivodeship, in south-central Poland. It lies approximately 6 km (4 mi) east of Opatów and 63 km (39 mi) east of the regional capital Kielce.
