= Włostów, Świętokrzyskie Voivodeship =

Włostów
- Village
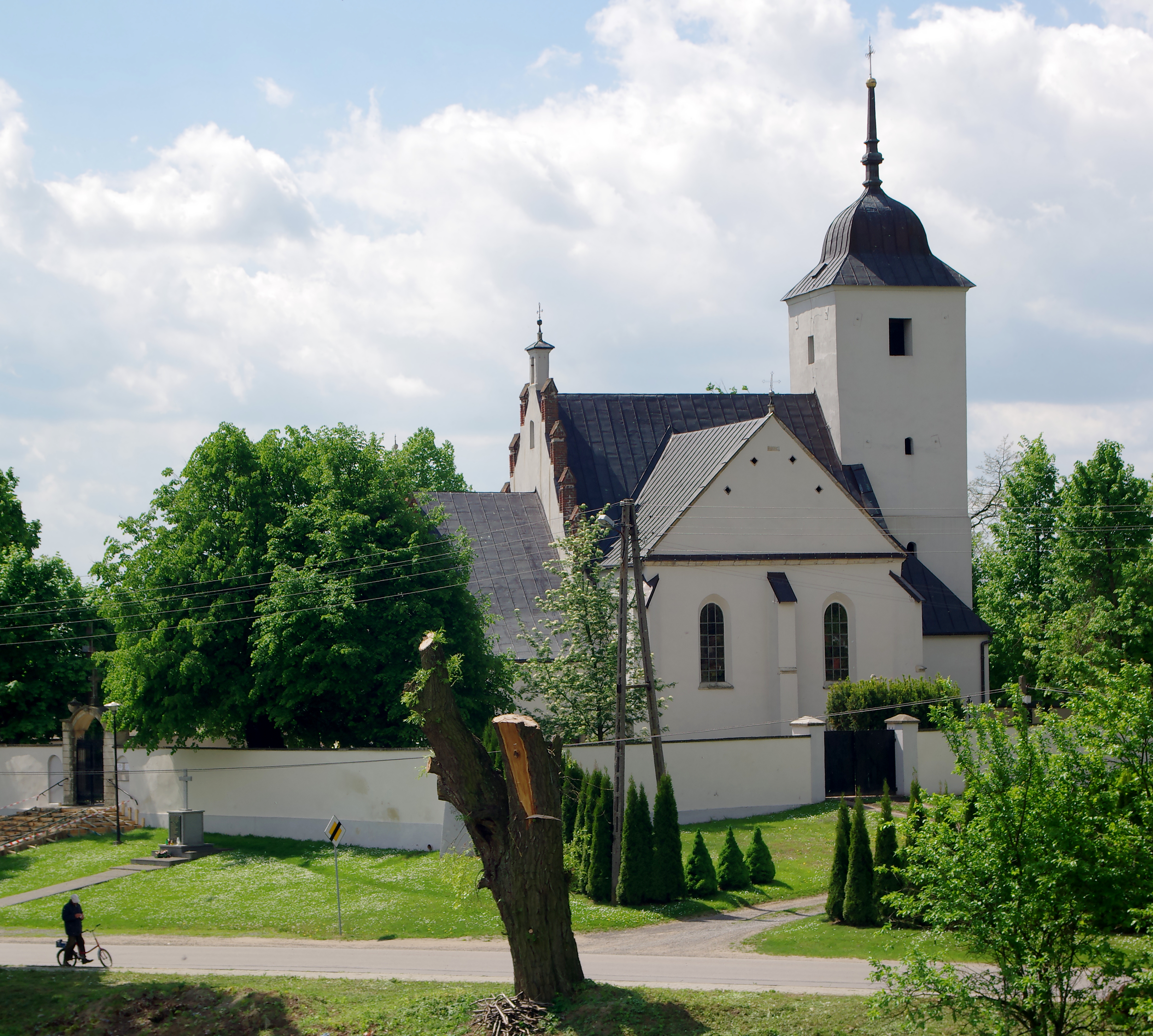
- Church of Saint John the Baptist

- Location within Poland
- Coordinates: 50°44′47″N 21°26′27″E
- Country: Poland
- Voivodeship: Świętokrzyskie
- County: Opatów
- Gmina: Lipnik

Population
  - Total: 1,800

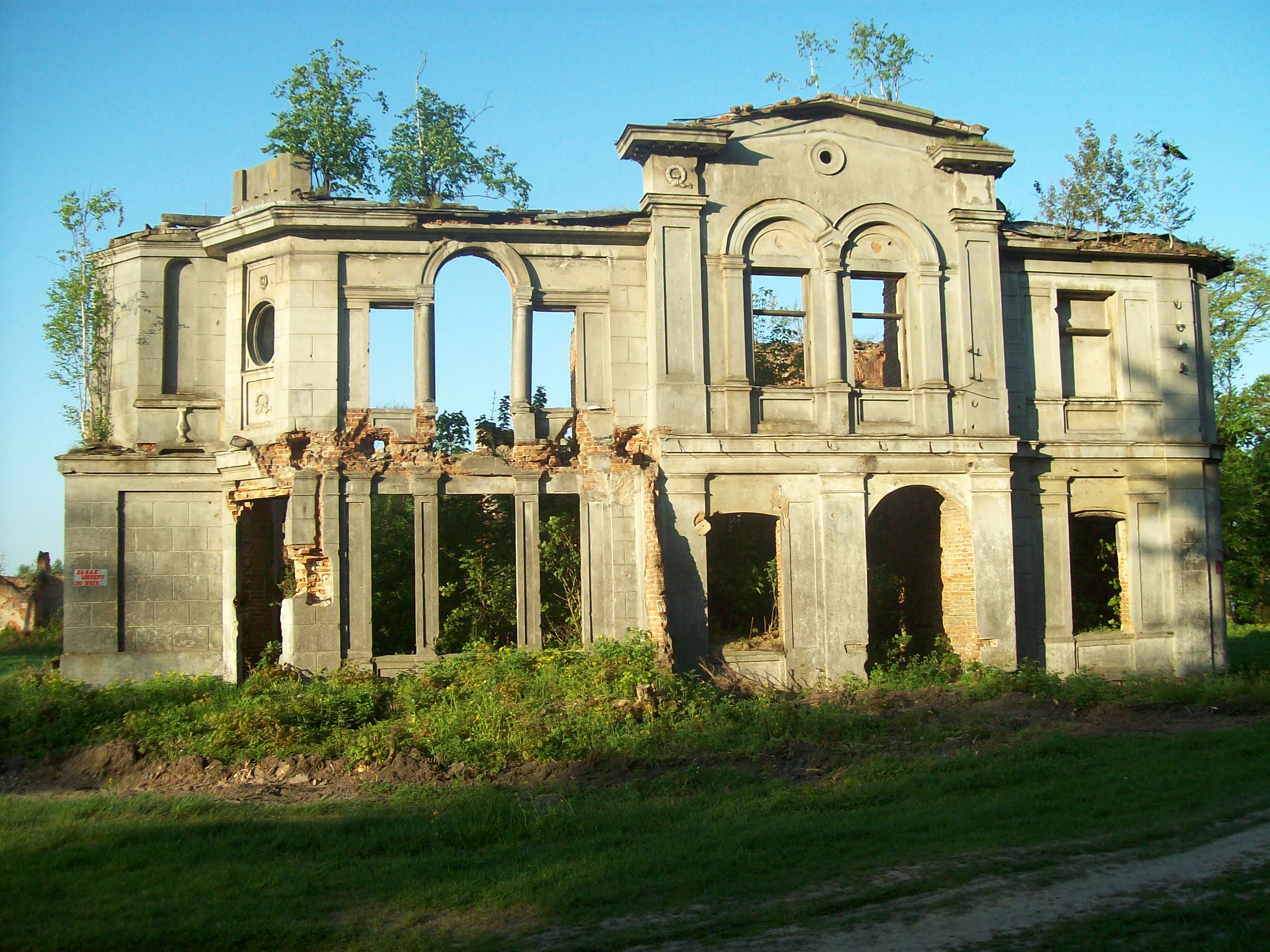
Ruins of Karski Palace

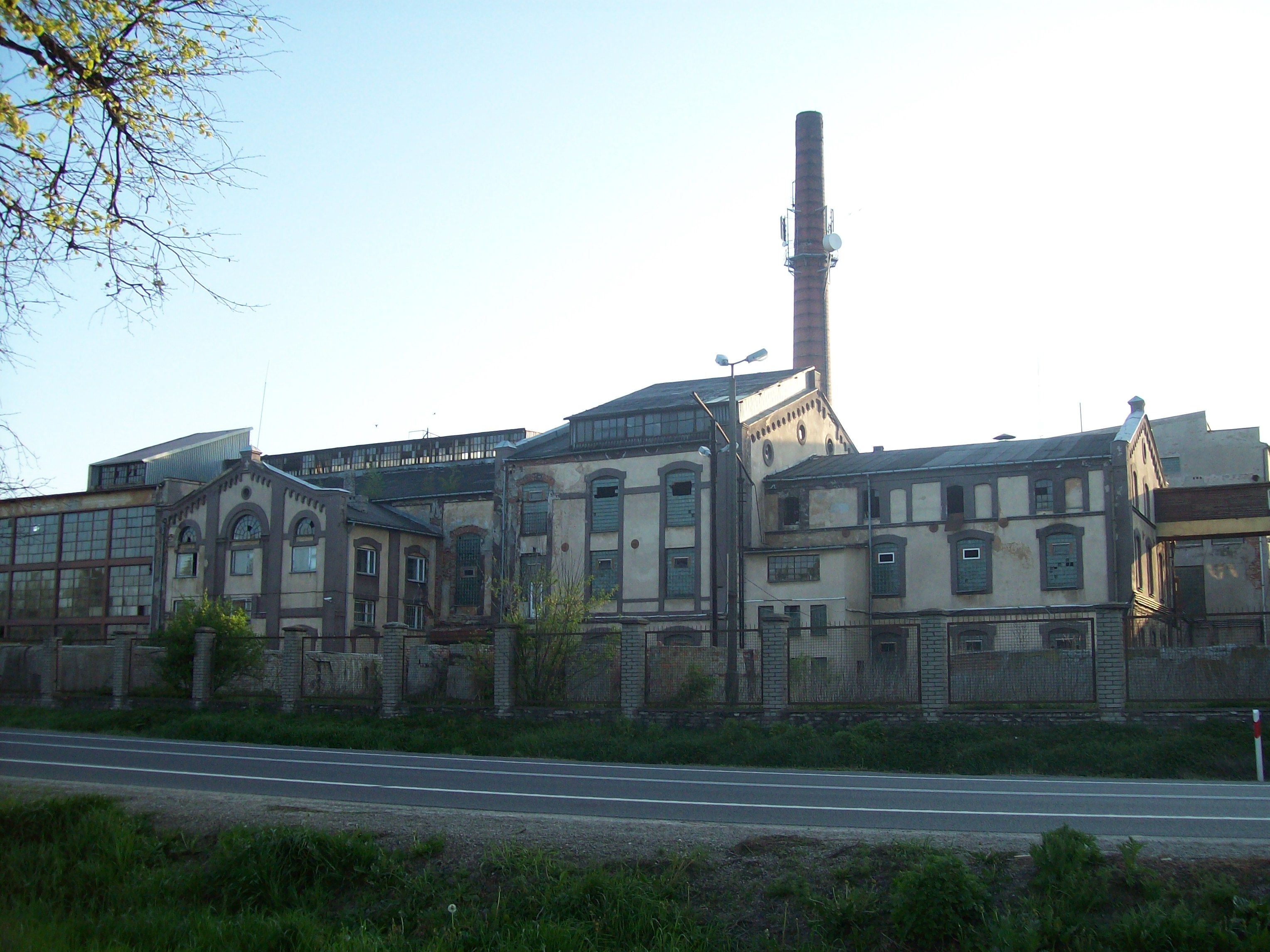
Closed sugar factory

Włostów [ˈvwɔstuf] is a village in the administrative district of Gmina Lipnik, within Opatów County, Świętokrzyskie Voivodeship, in south-central Poland. It lies approximately 4 km (2 mi) north-west of Lipnik, 7 km (4 mi) south of Opatów, and 60 km (37 mi) east of the regional capital Kielce.
