= Gołębiów, Świętokrzyskie Voivodeship =

Gołębiów
- Village
- Location within Poland
- Coordinates: 50°43′34″N 21°31′28″E
- Country: Poland
- Voivodeship: Świętokrzyskie
- County: Opatów
- Gmina: Lipnik
- Population: 250

Gołębiów [ɡɔˈwɛmbjuf] is a village in the administrative district of Gmina Lipnik, within Opatów County, Świętokrzyskie Voivodeship, in south-central Poland. It lies approximately 3 km (2 mi) east of Lipnik, 12 km (7 mi) south-east of Opatów, and 67 km (42 mi) east of the regional capital Kielce.
