= Ptkanów =

- Village
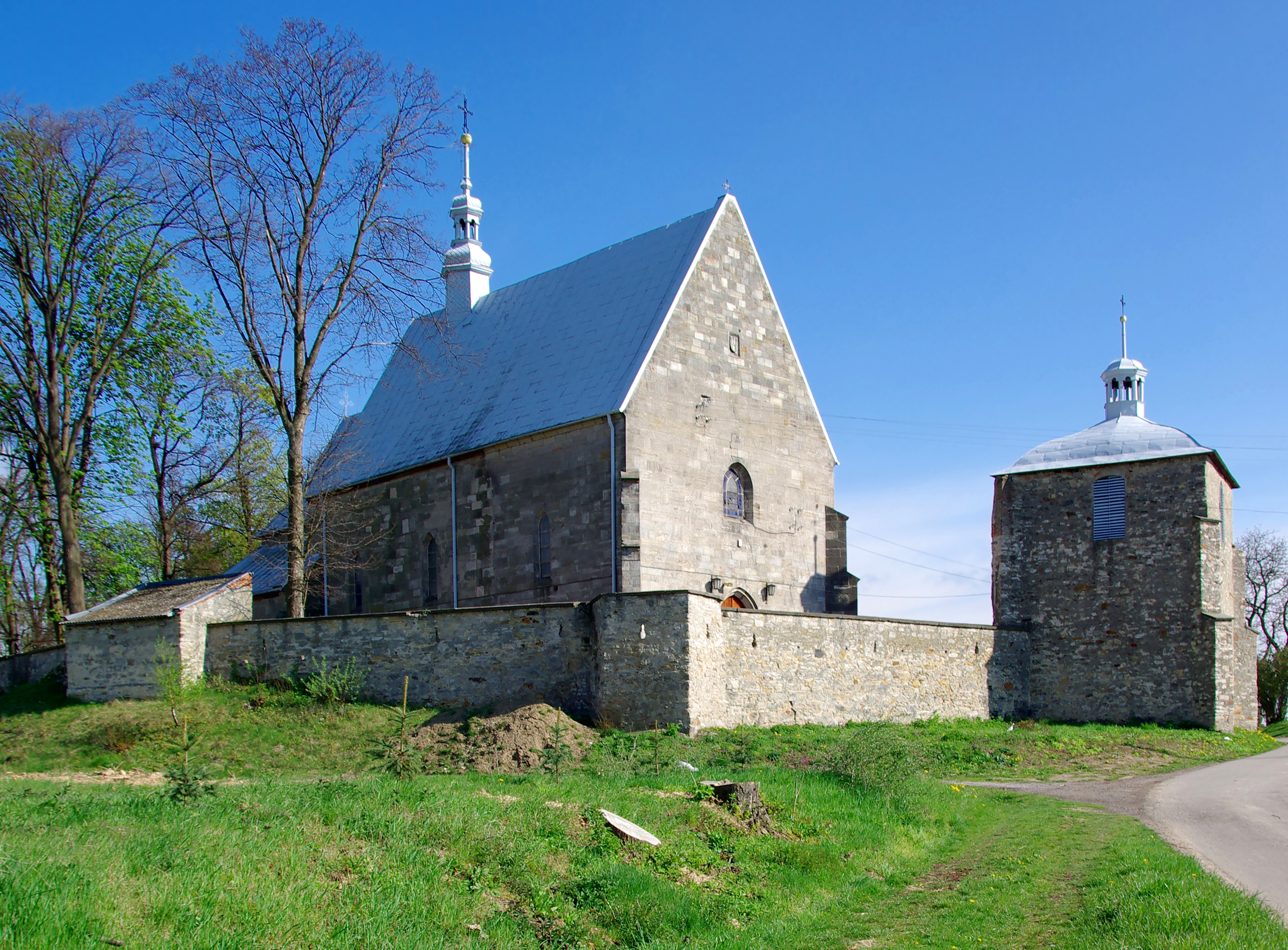
- Saint Giles Church in Ptkanów

- Location within Poland
- Coordinates: 50°50′22″N 21°27′23″E
- Country: Poland
- Voivodeship: Świętokrzyskie
- County: Opatów
- Gmina: Opatów

Ptkanów [ˈptkanuf] is a village in the administrative district of Gmina Opatów, within Opatów County, Świętokrzyskie Voivodeship, in south-central Poland.

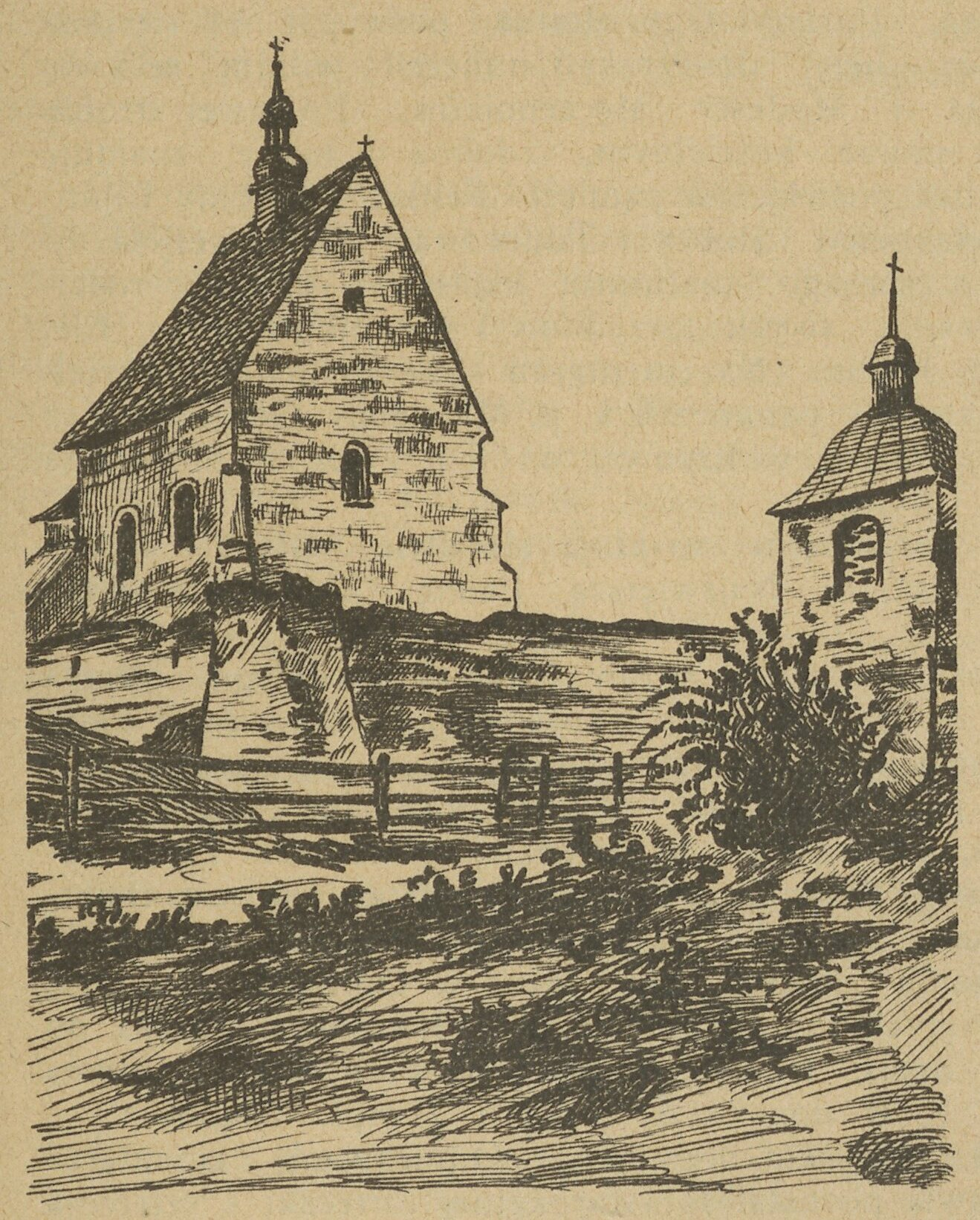
Church of Saing Giles, before 1907
