= Adamów, Gmina Opatów =

Adamów
- Village
- Location within Poland
- Coordinates: 50°48′32″N 21°27′34″E
- Country: Poland
- Voivodeship: Świętokrzyskie
- County: Opatów
- Gmina: Opatów
- Population: 130

Adamów [aˈdamuf] is a village in the administrative district of Gmina Opatów, within Opatów County, Świętokrzyskie Voivodeship, in south-central Poland. It lies approximately 3 km (2 mi) east of Opatów and 60 km (37 mi) east of the regional capital Kielce.
