= Lipowa, Świętokrzyskie Voivodeship =

Lipowa
- Village
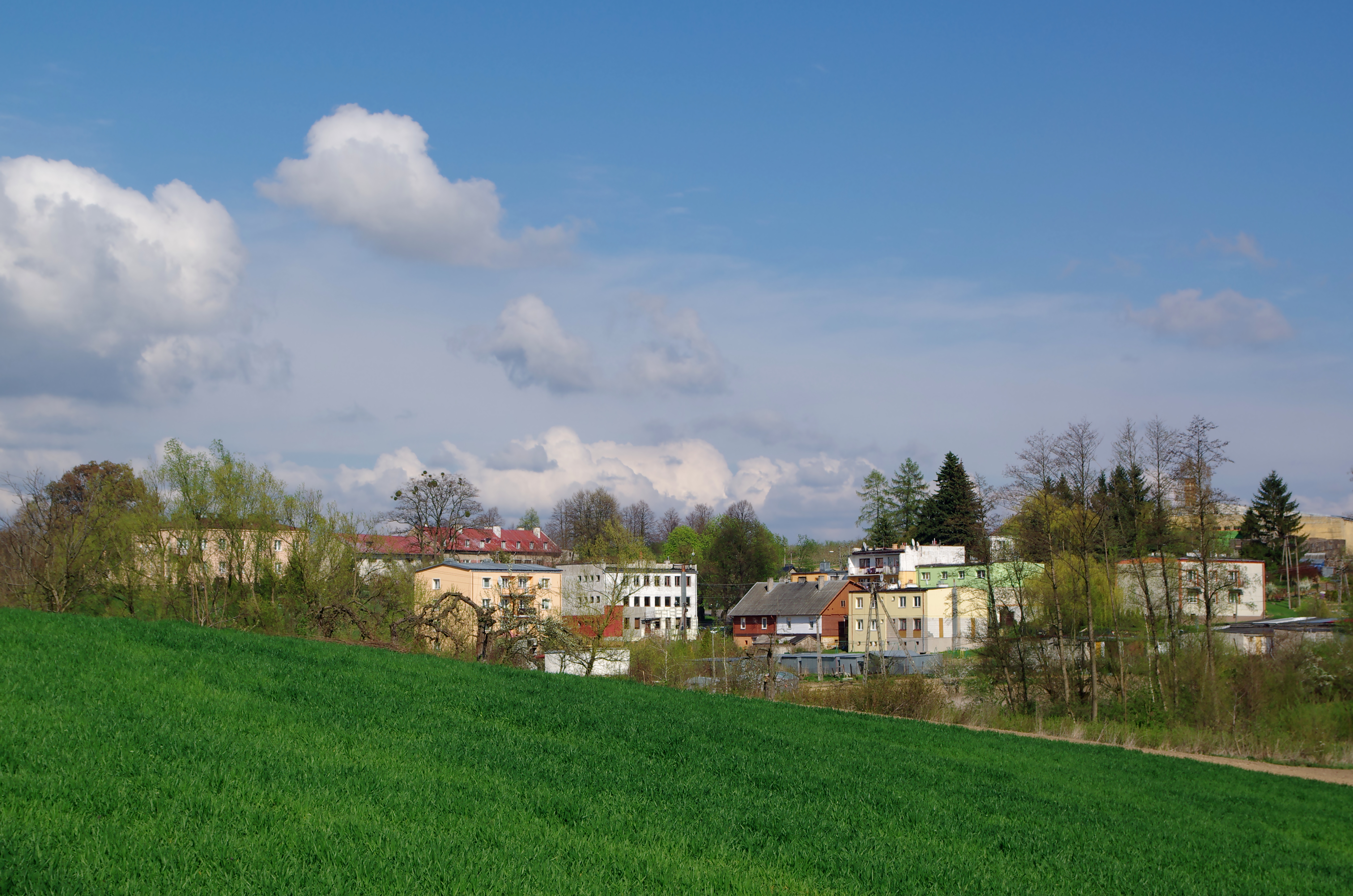

- Location within Poland
- Coordinates: 50°49′26″N 21°26′39″E
- Country: Poland
- Voivodeship: Świętokrzyskie
- County: Opatów
- Gmina: Opatów
- Population: 300

Lipowa [liˈpɔva] is a village in the administrative district of Gmina Opatów, within Opatów County, Świętokrzyskie Voivodeship, in south-central Poland. It lies approximately 3 km (2 mi) north-east of Opatów and 59 km (37 mi) east of the regional capital Kielce.
