= Gmina Opatów, Świętokrzyskie Voivodeship =

Gmina Opatów Opatów Commune
- Gmina
- Coat of arms

- Location within Poland
- Coordinates (Opatów): 50°48′18″N 21°25′29″E
- Country: Poland
- Voivodeship: Świętokrzyskie
- County: Opatów
- Seat: Opatów

Area
  - Total: 113.39 km^{2} (43.78 sq mi)

Population (2006)
  - Total: 12,635
  - Density: 111.43/km^{2} (288.60/sq mi)
  - Urban: 6,846
  - Rural: 5,789
- Website: https://web.archive.org/web/20071011021240/http://www.opatow.um.gov.pl/

Gmina Opatów is an urban-rural gmina (administrative district) in Opatów County, Świętokrzyskie Voivodeship, in south-central Poland. Its seat is the town of Opatów, which lies approximately 58 kilometres (36 mi) east of the regional capital Kielce.

The gmina covers an area of 113.39 square kilometres (43.8 sq mi), and as of 2006 its total population is 12,635 (out of which the population of Opatów amounts to 6,846, and the population of the rural part of the gmina is 5,789).

== Villages ==
Apart from the town of Opatów, Gmina Opatów contains the villages and settlements of Adamów, Balbinów, Brzezie, Czerników Karski, Czerników Opatowski, Gojców, Jagnin, Jałowęsy, Jurkowice, Karwów, Kobylanki, Kobylany, Kochów, Kornacice, Lipowa, Marcinkowice, Nikisiałka Duża, Nikisiałka Mała, Oficjałów, Okalina, Okalina-Kolonia, Podole, Ptkanów, Rosochy, Strzyżowice, Tomaszów, Tudorów, Wąworków and Zochcinek.

== Neighbouring gminas ==
Gmina Opatów is bordered by the gminas of Baćkowice, Ćmielów, Iwaniska, Lipnik, Sadowie and Wojciechowice.
