= Marcinkowice, Opatów County =

Marcinkowice
- Village
- Location within Poland
- Coordinates: 50°47′53″N 21°24′4″E
- Country: Poland
- Voivodeship: Świętokrzyskie
- County: Opatów
- Gmina: Opatów
- Population: 310

Marcinkowice [mart͡ɕiŋkɔˈvit͡sɛ] is a village in the administrative district of Gmina Opatów, within Opatów County, Świętokrzyskie Voivodeship, in south-central Poland. It lies approximately 2 km (1 mi) south-west of Opatów and 56 km (35 mi) east of the regional capital Kielce.
