= Oficjałów =

- Village
- Location within Poland
- Coordinates: 50°47′13″N 21°26′18″E
- Country: Poland
- Voivodeship: Świętokrzyskie
- County: Opatów
- Gmina: Opatów
- Population: 180

Oficjałów [ɔfit͡sˈjawuf] is a village in the administrative district of Gmina Opatów, within Opatów County, Świętokrzyskie Voivodeship, in south-central Poland. It lies approximately 3 km (2 mi) south-east of Opatów and 59 km (37 mi) east of the regional capital Kielce.
