= Nikisiałka Mała =

- Village
- Location within Poland
- Coordinates: 50°46′30″N 21°29′16″E
- Country: Poland
- Voivodeship: Świętokrzyskie
- County: Opatów
- Gmina: Opatów
- Population: 140

Nikisiałka Mała [nikiˈɕau̯ka ˈmawa] is a village in the administrative district of Gmina Opatów, within Opatów County, Świętokrzyskie Voivodeship, in south-central Poland. It lies approximately 6 km (4 mi) south-east of Opatów and 63 km (39 mi) east of the regional capital Kielce.
