= Kobylanki, Świętokrzyskie Voivodeship =

Kobylanki
- Village
- Location within Poland
- Coordinates: 50°46′28″N 21°21′6″E
- Country: Poland
- Voivodeship: Świętokrzyskie
- County: Opatów
- Gmina: Opatów
- Population: 120

Kobylanki [kɔbɨˈlanki] is a village in the administrative district of Gmina Opatów, within Opatów County, Świętokrzyskie Voivodeship, in south-central Poland. It lies approximately 7 km (4 mi) south-west of Opatów and 54 km (34 mi) east of the regional capital Kielce.
