= Gmina Lipnik =

Gmina Lipnik Lipnik Commune
- Gmina
- Coat of arms
- Interactive map of Gmina Lipnik
- Coordinates (Lipnik): 50°43′47″N 21°29′21″E
- Country: Poland
- Voivodeship: Świętokrzyskie
- County: Opatów
- Seat: Lipnik

Area
  - Total: 81.7 km^{2} (31.5 sq mi)

Population (2006)
  - Total: 5,751
  - Density: 70.4/km^{2} (182/sq mi)
- Website: http://www.lipnik.pl

Gmina Lipnik is a rural gmina (administrative district) in Opatów County, Świętokrzyskie Voivodeship, in south-central Poland. Its seat is the village of Lipnik, which lies approximately 10 kilometres (6 mi) south-east of Opatów and 64 km (40 mi) east of the regional capital Kielce.

The gmina covers an area of 81.7 square kilometres (31.5 sq mi), and as of 2006 its total population is 5,751.

== Villages ==
Gmina Lipnik contains the villages and settlements of Adamów, Gołębiów, Grocholice, Kaczyce, Kurów, Leszczków, Lipnik, Łownica, Malice Kościelne, Malżyn, Męczennice, Międzygórz, Słabuszewice, Słoptów, Sternalice, Studzianki, Swojków, Ublinek, Usarzów, Włostów, Zachoinie and Żurawniki.

== Neighbouring gminas ==
Gmina Lipnik is bordered by the gminas of Iwaniska, Klimontów, Obrazów, Opatów, Wilczyce and Wojciechowice.
