= Nikisiałka Duża =

- Village
- Location within Poland
- Coordinates: 50°47′13″N 21°30′13″E
- Country: Poland
- Voivodeship: Świętokrzyskie
- County: Opatów
- Gmina: Opatów
- Population: 230

Nikisiałka Duża [nikiˈɕau̯ka ˈduʐa] is a village in the administrative district of Gmina Opatów, within Opatów County, Świętokrzyskie Voivodeship, in south-central Poland. It lies approximately 6 km (4 mi) east of Opatów and 64 km (40 mi) east of the regional capital Kielce.
