= Zochcinek =

- Village
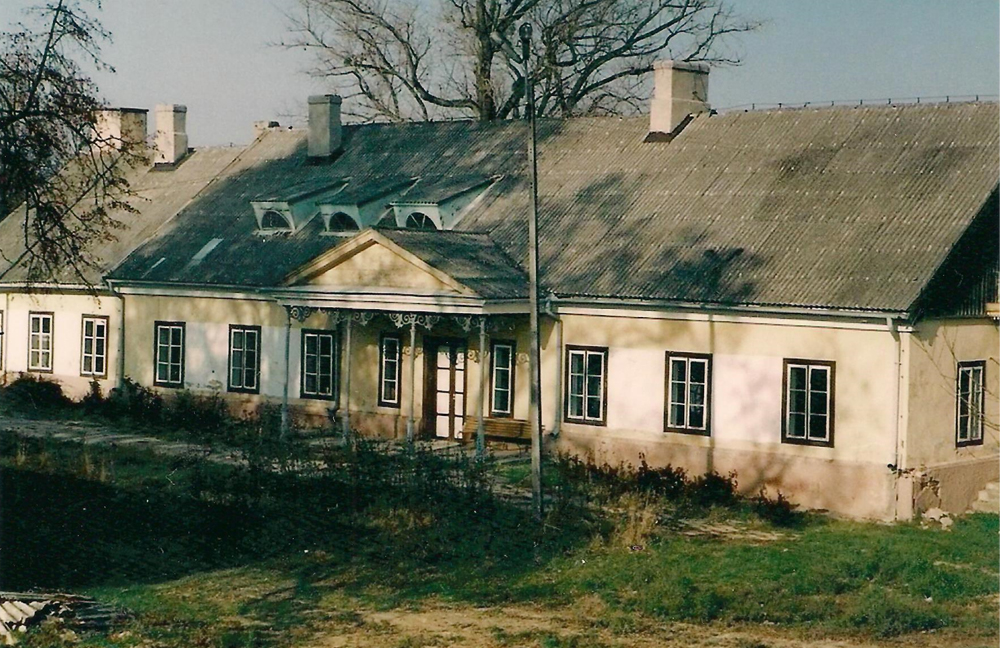
- Manor house

- Location within Poland
- Coordinates: 50°48′55″N 21°23′39″E
- Country: Poland
- Voivodeship: Świętokrzyskie
- County: Opatów
- Gmina: Opatów
- Population: 250

Zochcinek [zɔxˈt͡ɕinɛk] is a village in the administrative district of Gmina Opatów, within Opatów County, Świętokrzyskie Voivodeship, in south-central Poland. It lies approximately 3 km (2 mi) north-west of Opatów and 56 km (35 mi) east of the regional capital Kielce.
