= Wąworków =

- Village
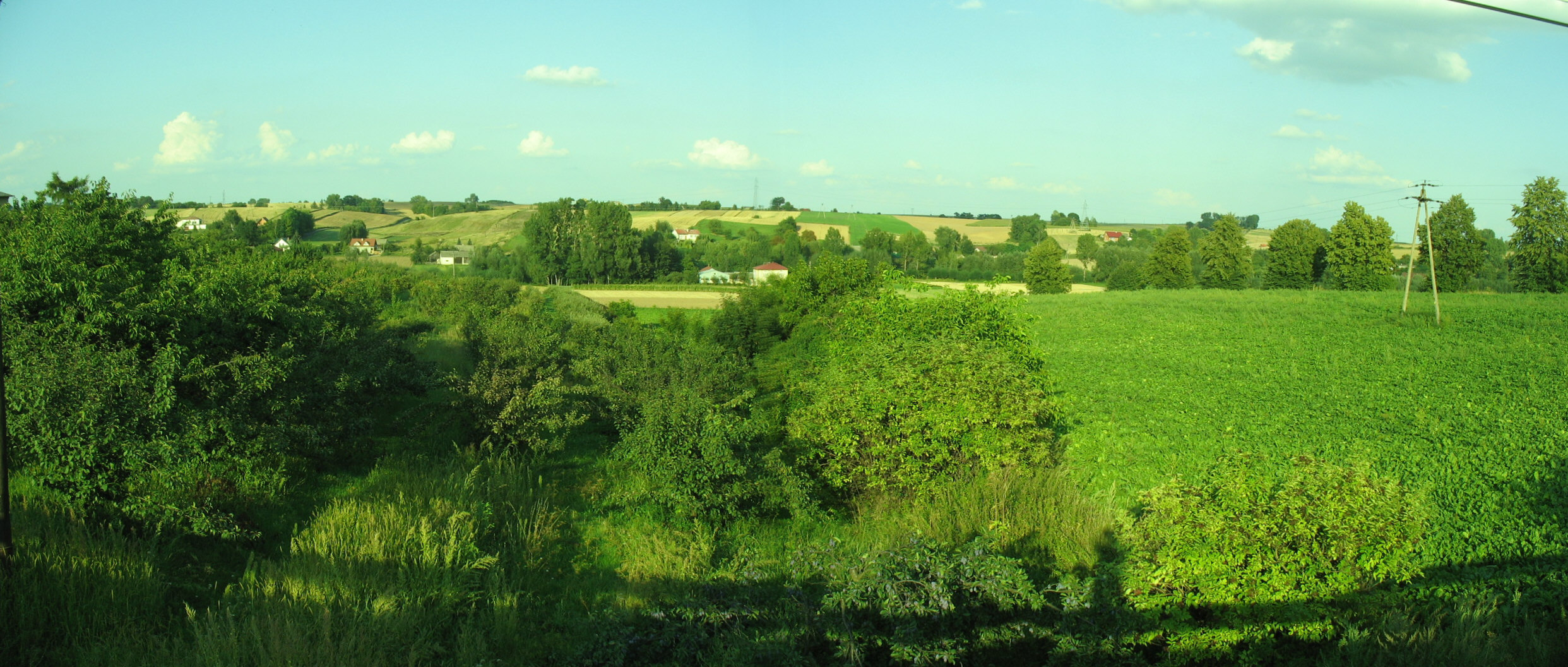

- Location within Poland
- Coordinates: 50°47′39″N 21°26′49″E
- Country: Poland
- Voivodeship: Świętokrzyskie
- County: Opatów
- Gmina: Opatów
- Population: 420

Wąworków [vɔ̃ˈvɔrkuf] is a village in the administrative district of Gmina Opatów, within Opatów County, Świętokrzyskie Voivodeship, in south-central Poland. It lies approximately 2 km (1 mi) south-east of Opatów and 60 km (37 mi) east of the regional capital Kielce.
