= Kaczyce, Świętokrzyskie Voivodeship =

Kaczyce
- Village
- Location within Poland
- Coordinates: 50°43′25″N 21°24′27″E
- Country: Poland
- Voivodeship: Świętokrzyskie
- County: Opatów
- Gmina: Lipnik
- Population: 240

Kaczyce [kaˈt͡ʂɨt͡sɛ] is a village in the administrative district of Gmina Lipnik, within Opatów County, Świętokrzyskie Voivodeship, in south-central Poland. It lies approximately 6 km (4 mi) west of Lipnik, 10 km (6 mi) south of Opatów, and 59 km (37 mi) east of the regional capital Kielce.
