= Kobylany, Świętokrzyskie Voivodeship =

Kobylany
- Village
- Location within Poland
- Coordinates: 50°45′51″N 21°20′37″E
- Country: Poland
- Voivodeship: Świętokrzyskie
- County: Opatów
- Gmina: Opatów
- Population: 840

Kobylany [kɔbɨˈlanɨ] is a village in the administrative district of Gmina Opatów, within Opatów County, Świętokrzyskie Voivodeship, in south-central Poland. It lies approximately 8 km (5 mi) south-west of Opatów and 53 km (33 mi) east of the regional capital Kielce.
