= Kochów, Świętokrzyskie Voivodeship =

Kochów
- Village
- Location within Poland
- Coordinates: 50°46′5″N 21°22′0″E
- Country: Poland
- Voivodeship: Świętokrzyskie
- County: Opatów
- Gmina: Opatów
- Population: 150

Kochów [ˈkɔxuf] is a village in the administrative district of Gmina Opatów, within Opatów County, Świętokrzyskie Voivodeship, in south-central Poland. It lies approximately 6 km (4 mi) south-west of Opatów and 55 km (34 mi) east of the regional capital Kielce.
