= Strzyżowice, Świętokrzyskie Voivodeship =

Strzyżowice
- Village
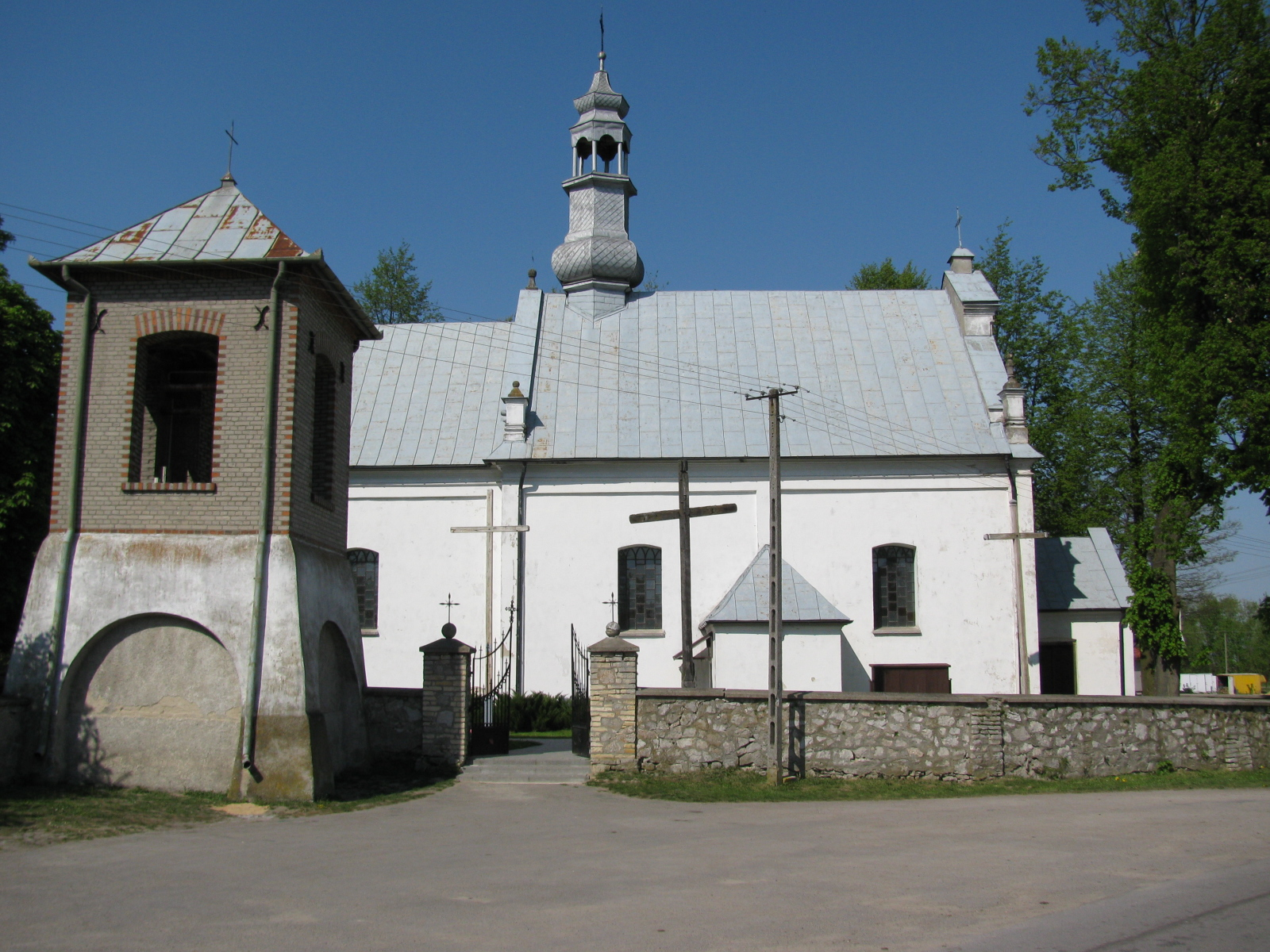
- Saint Bartholomew Church

- Location within Poland
- Coordinates: 50°44′53″N 21°22′19″E
- Country: Poland
- Voivodeship: Świętokrzyskie
- County: Opatów
- Gmina: Opatów

Population
  - Total: 420

Strzyżowice [stʂɨʐɔˈvit͡sɛ] is a village in the administrative district of Gmina Opatów, within Opatów County, Świętokrzyskie Voivodeship, in south-central Poland. It lies approximately 8 km (5 mi) south-west of Opatów and 56 km (35 mi) east of the regional capital Kielce.

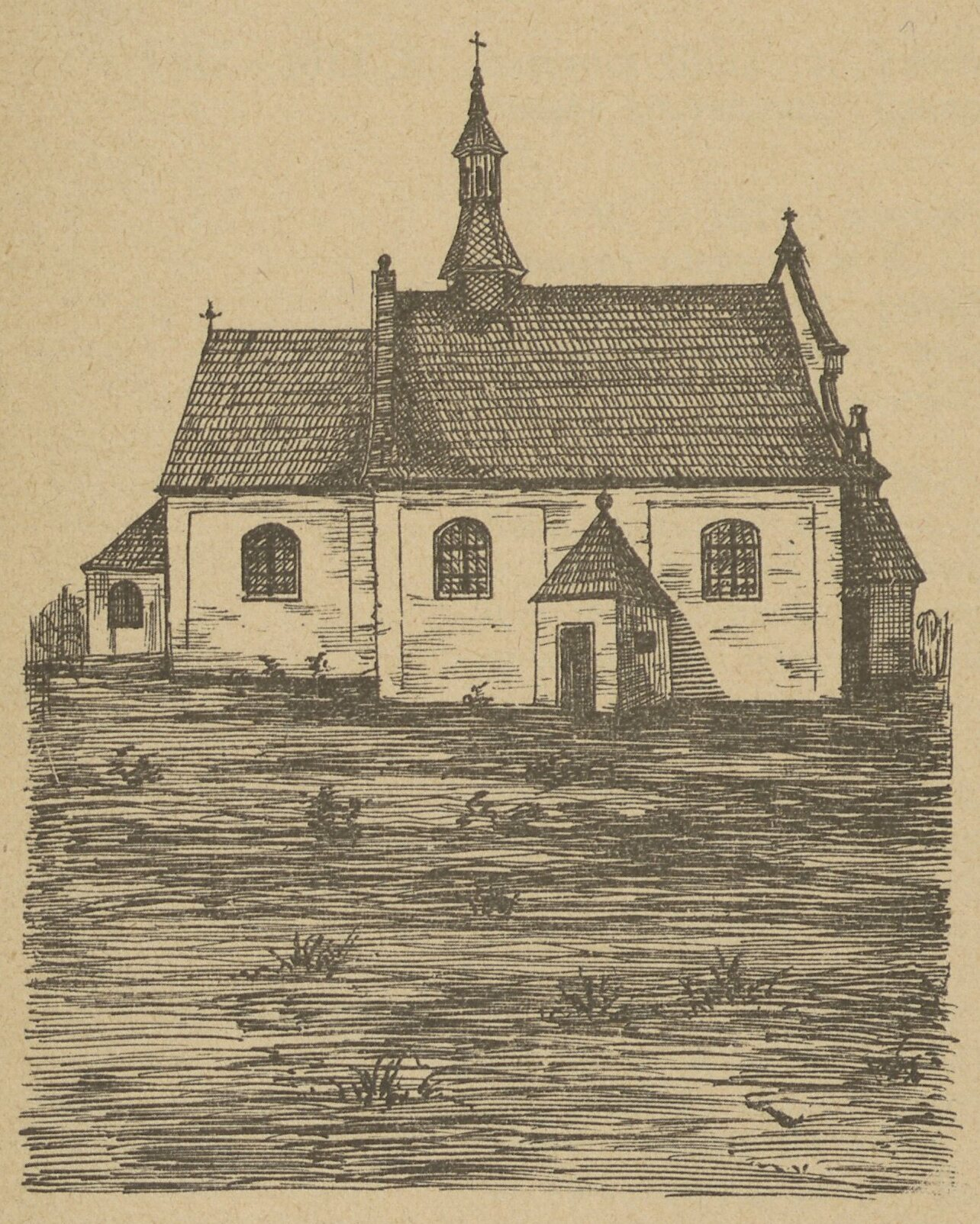
Church of Saint Bartholome before 1907
