= Rosochy, Świętokrzyskie Voivodeship =

Rosochy
- Village
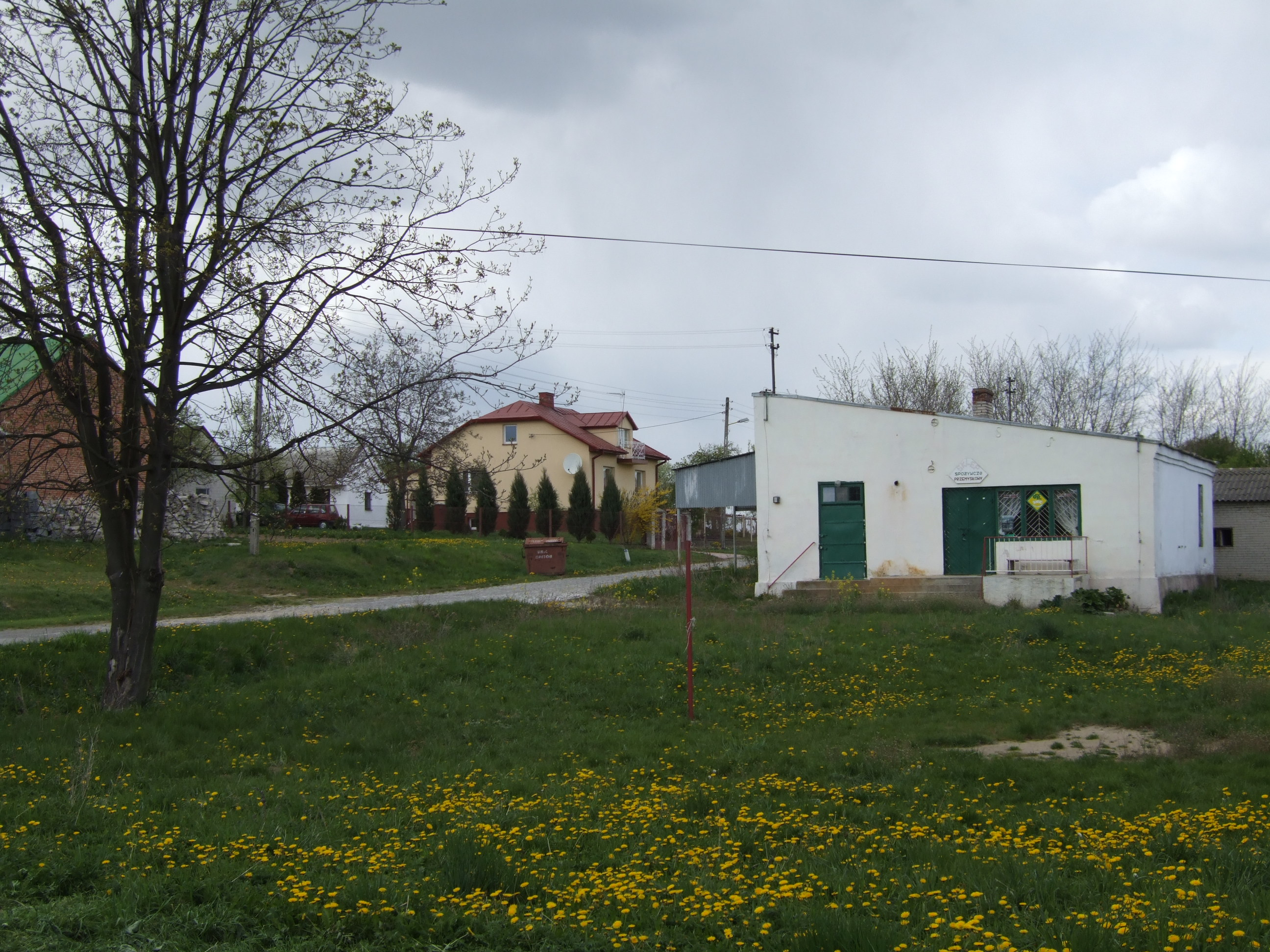

- Location within Poland
- Coordinates: 50°49′44″N 21°29′17″E
- Country: Poland
- Voivodeship: Świętokrzyskie
- County: Opatów
- Gmina: Opatów
- Population: 160

Rosochy [rɔˈsɔxɨ] is a village in the administrative district of Gmina Opatów, within Opatów County, Świętokrzyskie Voivodeship, in south-central Poland. It lies approximately 6 km (4 mi) north-east of Opatów and 62 km (39 mi) east of the regional capital Kielce.
