= Jurkowice, Opatów County =

Jurkowice
- Village
- Location within Poland
- Coordinates: 50°47′31″N 21°22′38″E
- Country: Poland
- Voivodeship: Świętokrzyskie
- County: Opatów
- Gmina: Opatów
- Population: 180

Jurkowice [jurkɔˈvit͡sɛ] is a village in the administrative district of Gmina Opatów, within Opatów County, Świętokrzyskie Voivodeship, in south-central Poland. It lies approximately 4 km (2 mi) south-west of Opatów and 55 km (34 mi) east of the regional capital Kielce.
