= Okalina =

- Village
- Location within Poland
- Coordinates: 50°46′39″N 21°25′17″E
- Country: Poland
- Voivodeship: Świętokrzyskie
- County: Opatów
- Gmina: Opatów
- Population: 100

Okalina [ɔkaˈlina] is a village in the administrative district of Gmina Opatów, within Opatów County, Świętokrzyskie Voivodeship, in south-central Poland. It lies approximately 4 km (2 mi) south of Opatów and 58 km (36 mi) east of the regional capital Kielce.
