= Nagnajów =

District of Tarnobrzeg

Coordinates: 50°31′08″N 21°36′47″E

- Osiedle
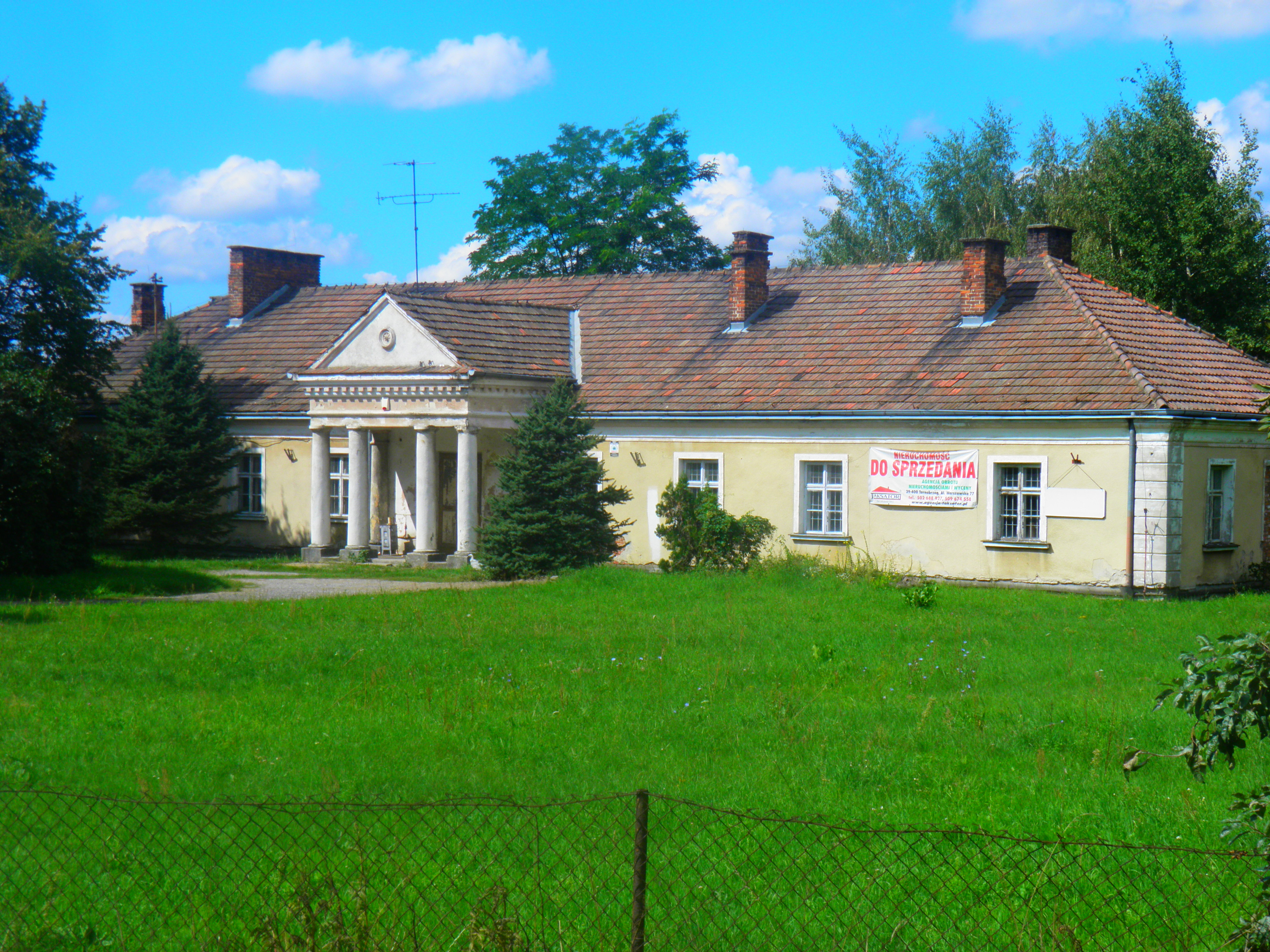
- The former manor house in Nagnajów
- Interactive map of Nagnajów
- Country: Poland
- Voivodeship: Podkarpackie
- Region: Sandomierz Basin
- City: Tarnobrzeg
- Incorporated: 1 January 1992

Government
  - Type: Zarząd
  - Body: Osiedla Nagnajów
  - Chairman: Bogumiła Karaban

Area
  - Total: 324.25 ha (801.2 acres)
- SIMC: 0980205
- Vehicle registration: RT

Nagnajów is the newest osiedle of Tarnobrzeg, Podkarpackie Voivodeship, Poland. The former 324.25 hectare village, located to the extreme south of the town, was incorporated into Tarnobrzeg from the neighbouring Gmina Baranów Sandomierski in 1992, and received the status of an osiedle. Nagnajow is an important road junction, with a 1960s Vistula river double bridge for rail and road traffic.
