= Nowa Dęba =

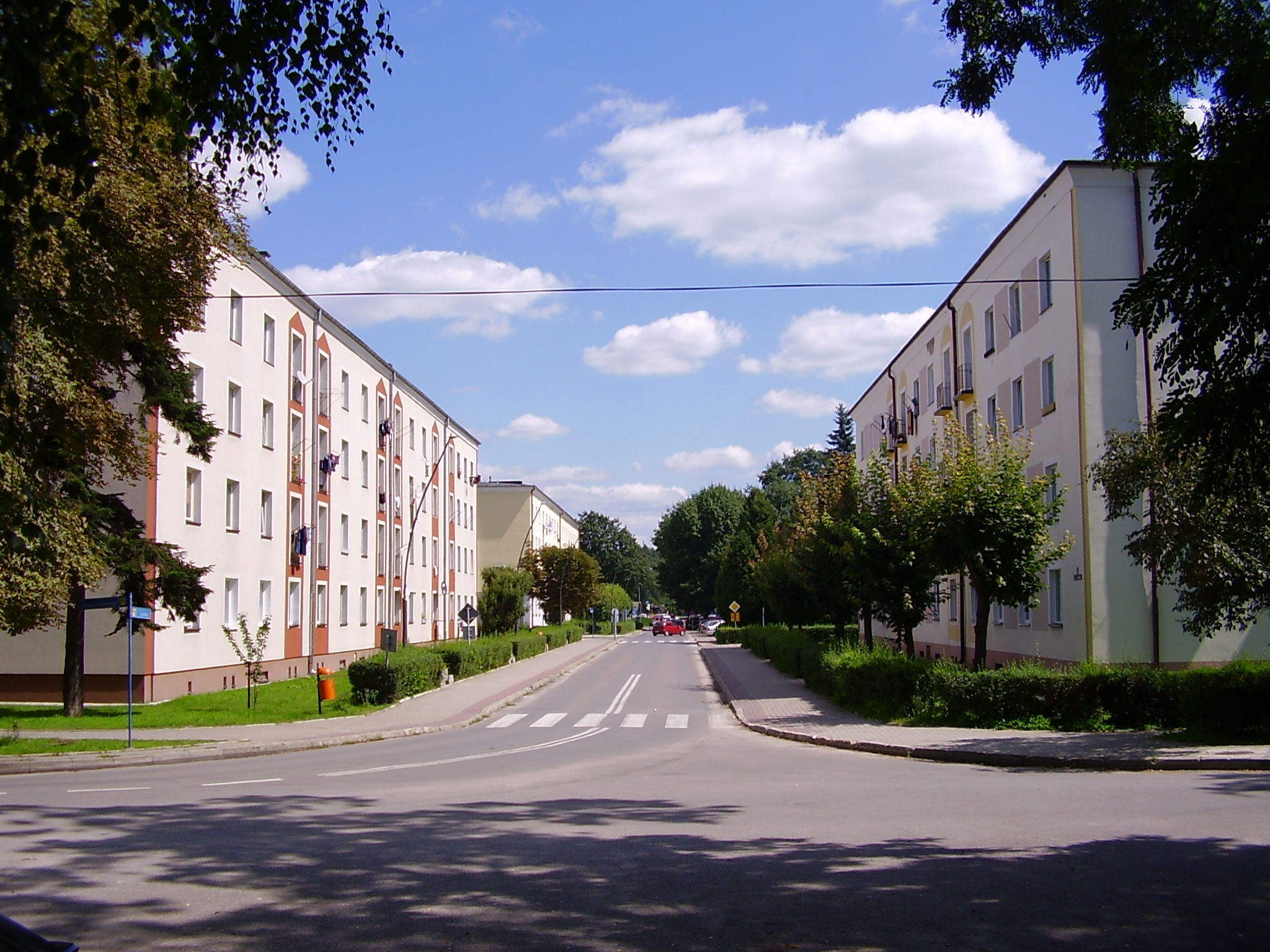
- Nowa Dęba, 2011

- Coat of arms

- Location within Poland
- Coordinates: 50°25′N 21°46′E
- Country: Poland
- Voivodeship: Subcarpathian
- County: Tarnobrzeg
- Gmina: Nowa Dęba

Government
  - Mayor: Wiesław Ordon

Area
  - Total: 16.31 km^{2} (6.30 sq mi)

Population (2006)
  - Total: 11,390
  - Density: 698.3/km^{2} (1,809/sq mi)
- Time zone: UTC+1 (CET)
  - Summer (DST): UTC+2 (CEST)
- Postal code: 39-460
- Car plates: RTA
- Website: https://www.nowadeba.pl/

Nowa Dęba [ˈnɔva ˈdɛmba] is a town in Tarnobrzeg County, Subcarpathian Voivodeship, Poland, with a population of 11,310, as of 2 June 2009. Nowa Dęba belongs to historic Lesser Poland, and is located in the Sandomierz Forest, along European route E371. Near the town is the Tarnobrzeg Special Economic Zone (TSSE), as well as a large military training area of the Polish Army.

== History ==
As of the late 19th century, there was a pottery industry in Dęba. The manor area belonged to the Tarnowski family.

In the interwar period, Dęba was administratively located in the Tarnobrzeg County in the Lwów Voivodeship of Poland. According to the 1921 census, it had a population of 1,071, entirely Polish by nationality.

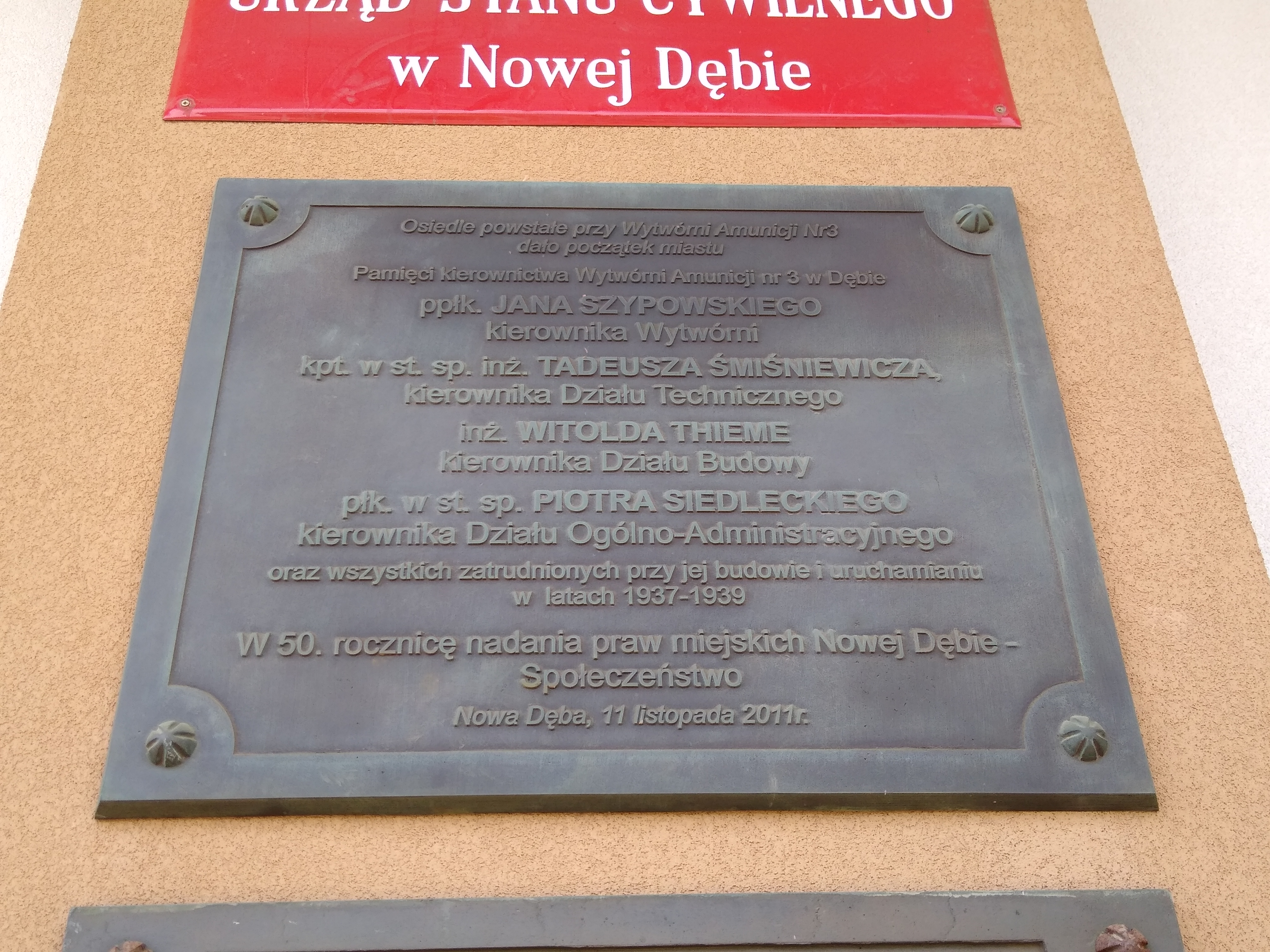
Memorial plaque to the first directors of the munitions factory

Like Stalowa Wola, Nowa Dęba is a town which owes its existence to the Central Industrial Region. In the late 1930s, the government of the Second Polish Republic decided to build the Ammunition Factory Nr. 3 in the forest village of Dęba. The first manager of the plant was Jan Szypowski, who had previously been deputy manager of Ammunition Factory Nr. 2 in Skarżysko-Kamienna, and the money to build the factory in Dęba came from a French military loan. The Polish government chose this location because of the already-existing Army training area, where ammunition was tested. In 1938, the construction of a workers’ settlement began, with a school, hospital, cafeteria, houses, swimming pool and blocks of flats.

Following the German-Soviet invasion of Poland, which started World War II in September 1939, Dęba was occupied by Germany, and the factory and training area in Dęba were used by the Germans. In 1944, the settlement was captured by the Red Army, and in the Polish People's Republic, the Ammunition Factory Nr. 3 was renamed to Metal Plant DEZAMET. Apart from military products, the plant also manufactured engines and clothes irons. Dęba was granted town rights on December 31, 1961, and on the same day, its name was changed to Nowa Dęba, or New Dęba.

== Military ==
Nowa Dęba is the site of a Polish Land Forces base which houses the 18th Artillery Brigade, which in turn is part of the 18th Mechanized Division, reactivated by the Polish military in 2018 in response to increased security threats from Russia.

== Sports ==
Nowa Dęba has a sports club Stal Nowa Dęba, established in 1953.

== International relations ==
=== Twin towns — Sister cities ===
- Sukhovolya, Ukraine

Former twin towns:

- (Republic of Ireland) Fermoy, Ireland

On 12 October 2020, the Irish city of Fermoy ended its twin town partnership with Nowa Dęba as a reaction to the LGBT-free zone declaration adopted by the Polish city's authorities. On 28 January 2021, the Nowa Dęba's council voted to revoke the controversial declaration. The decision was welcomed by the LGBT community and activists.
