= Czerników Opatowski =

Czerników Karski
- Village
- Location within Poland
- Coordinates: 50°47′2″N 21°23′2″E
- Country: Poland
- Voivodeship: Świętokrzyskie
- County: Opatów
- Gmina: Opatów

Czerników Karski [t͡ʂɛrˈnikuf ˈkarski] is a village in the administrative district of Gmina Opatów, within Opatów County, Świętokrzyskie Voivodeship, in south-central Poland. It lies approximately 4 km (2 mi) south-west of Opatów and 56 km (35 mi) east of the regional capital Kielce.
