= Barwinek, Podkarpackie Voivodeship =

Barwinek
- Village
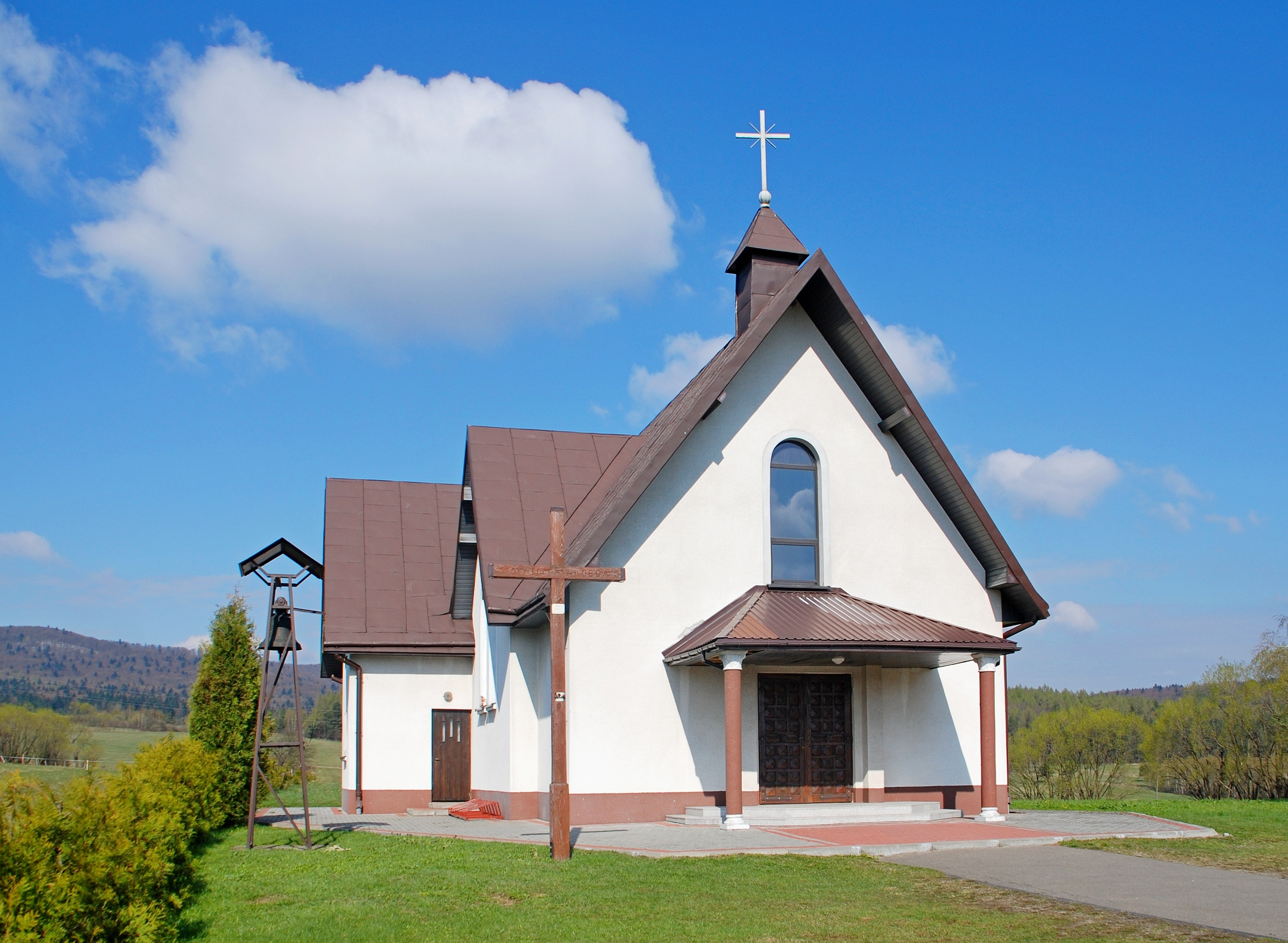
- Catholic church

- Location within Poland
- Coordinates: 49°25′55″N 21°41′16″E
- Country: Poland
- Voivodeship: Subcarpathian
- County: Krosno
- Gmina: Dukla
- Population: 230

Barwinek [barˈvʲinɛk] is a village in the administrative district of Gmina Dukla, within Krosno County, Subcarpathian Voivodeship, in south-eastern Poland, close to the border with Slovakia.
