= Lipnik, Opatów County =

Lipnik
- Village
- Coat of arms

- Location within Poland
- Coordinates: 50°43′47″N 21°29′21″E
- Country: Poland
- Voivodeship: Świętokrzyskie
- County: Opatów
- Gmina: Lipnik
- Population: 400

Lipnik (Polish pronunciation: [ˈlipɲik]) is a village in Opatów County, Świętokrzyskie Voivodeship, in south-central Poland. It is the seat of the gmina (administrative district) called Gmina Lipnik. It lies approximately 10 km (6 mi) south-east of Opatów and 64 km (40 mi) east of the regional capital Kielce.
