= Julianów, Gmina Ożarów =

Julianów
- Village
- Location within Poland
- Coordinates: 50°53′29″N 21°36′52″E
- Country: Poland
- Voivodeship: Świętokrzyskie
- County: Opatów
- Gmina: Ożarów
- Population: 90

Julianów [juˈljanuf] is a village in the administrative district of Gmina Ożarów, within Opatów County, Świętokrzyskie Voivodeship, in south-central Poland. It lies approximately 4 km (2 mi) west of Ożarów, 17 km (11 mi) north-east of Opatów, and 71 km (44 mi) east of the regional capital Kielce.
