= Potok-Kolonia =

- Village
- Location within Poland
- Coordinates: 50°56′20″N 21°38′57″E
- Country: Poland
- Voivodeship: Świętokrzyskie
- County: Opatów
- Gmina: Ożarów
- Population: 70

Potok-Kolonia [ˈpɔtɔk kɔˈlɔɲa] is a village in the administrative district of Gmina Ożarów, within Opatów County, Świętokrzyskie Voivodeship, in south-central Poland. It lies approximately 6 km (4 mi) north of Ożarów, 22 km (14 mi) north-east of Opatów, and 73 km (45 mi) east of the regional capital Kielce.
