= Wyszmontów =

- Village
- Location within Poland
- Coordinates: 50°51′43″N 21°39′22″E
- Country: Poland
- Voivodeship: Świętokrzyskie
- County: Opatów
- Gmina: Ożarów
- Population: 470

Wyszmontów [vɨʂˈmɔntuf] is a village in the administrative district of Gmina Ożarów, within Opatów County, Świętokrzyskie Voivodeship, in south-central Poland. It lies approximately 4 km (2 mi) south of Ożarów, 18 km (11 mi) east of Opatów, and 74 km (46 mi) east of the regional capital Kielce.
