= Maruszów, Świętokrzyskie Voivodeship =

Maruszów
- Village
- Location within Poland
- Coordinates: 50°52′44″N 21°47′42″E
- Country: Poland
- Voivodeship: Świętokrzyskie
- County: Opatów
- Gmina: Ożarów
- Population: 310

Maruszów [maˈruʂuf] is a village in the administrative district of Gmina Ożarów, within Opatów County, Świętokrzyskie Voivodeship, in south-central Poland. It lies approximately 10 km (6 mi) east of Ożarów, 28 km (17 mi) east of Opatów, and 83 km (52 mi) east of the regional capital Kielce.
