= Janików, Świętokrzyskie Voivodeship =

Janików
- Village
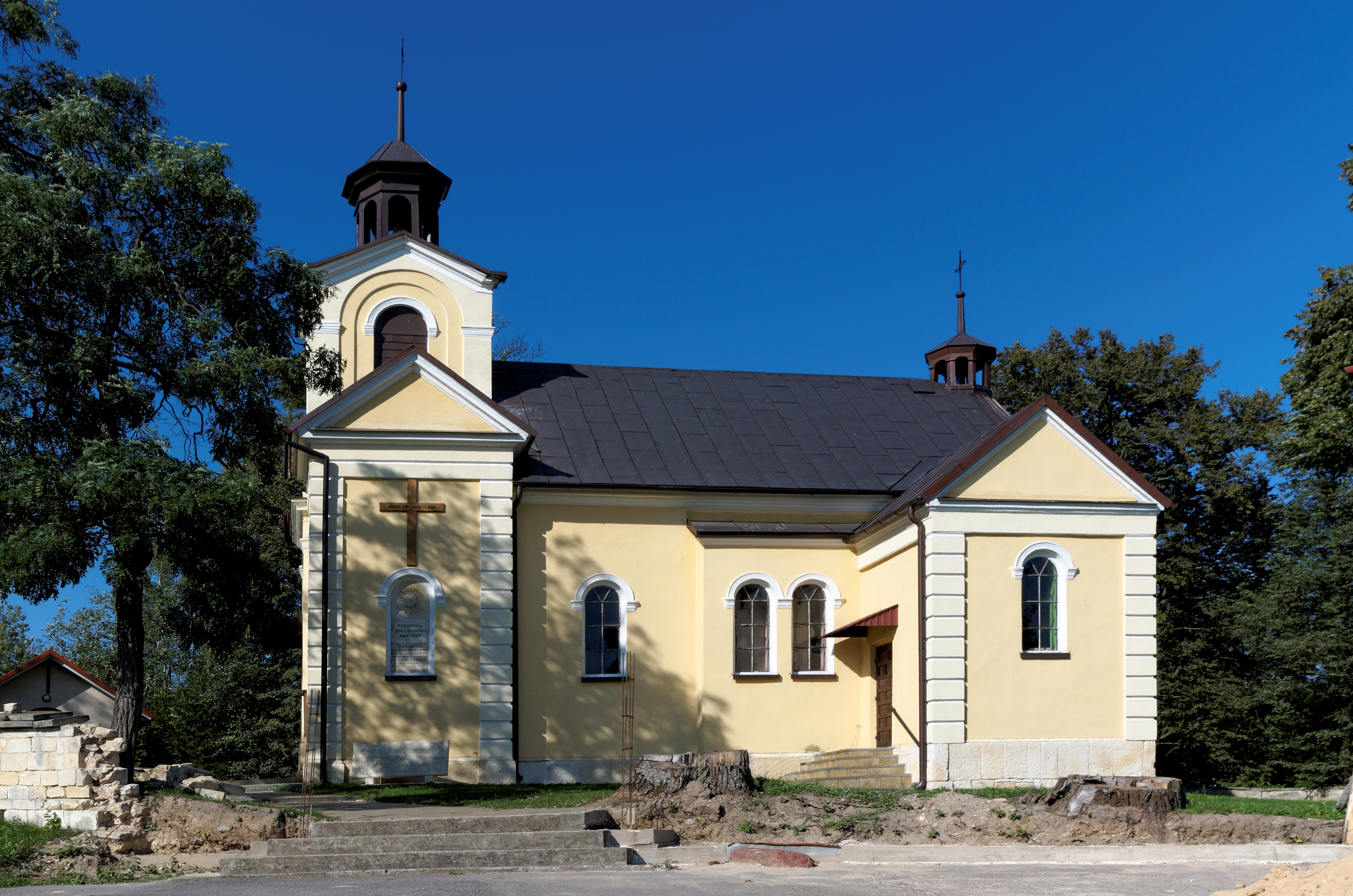
- Catholic church

- Location within Poland
- Coordinates: 50°51′33″N 21°42′38″E
- Country: Poland
- Voivodeship: Świętokrzyskie
- County: Opatów
- Gmina: Ożarów

Population
  - Total: 200

Janików [jaˈnikuf] is a village in the administrative district of Gmina Ożarów, within Opatów County, Świętokrzyskie Voivodeship, in south-central Poland. It lies approximately 5 km (3 mi) south-east of Ożarów, 21 km (13 mi) east of Opatów, and 77 km (48 mi) east of the regional capital Kielce. The village used to be a town from 1559 to 1827, and was a local center of stonemasonry. The village lies in the valley of the Czyzowka river, along regional road nr. 755, which goes from Zawichost to Ostrowiec Swietokrzyski. In northern districts of Janikow rich deposits of sandstone can be found.

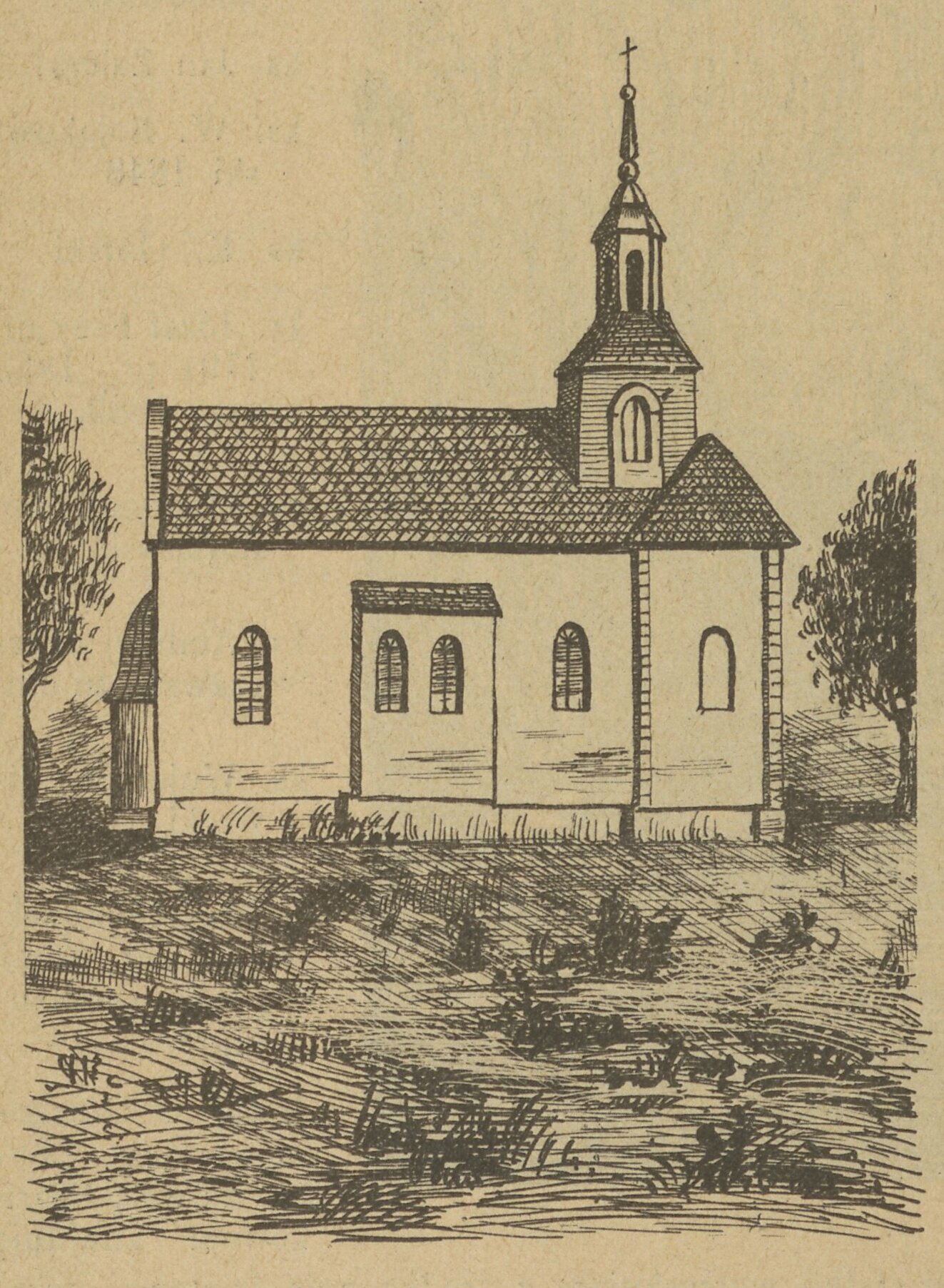
Saint Anne church before 1907

The history of Janikow dates back to the year 1559, when a local nobleman Stanislaw Janikowski founded the town of Janino. Its name was changed into Janikow after a few years, and the town remained in the hands of the Janikowski family until the mid-17th century. It remained a small and insignificant place, with population of approximately 2,000. Janikow had a parish school and a hospital, but its development was slow, due to proximity of well-established, ancient centers of Ozarow and Zawichost. In the 18th century, Janikow belonged to the Sapieha family, which encouraged the stonemasons. Among notable residents of the town was Tomasz Hutter, a sculptor, popular in the 18th century Lesser Poland.

In 1767, during a thunderstorm, almost whole town burned, together with a town hall and all documents. Janikow never recovered from the destruction, and in 1827 was stripped of town charter. In the late 19th century, while part of Russian-controlled Congress Poland, it had a population of 323, with 39 houses. The village was burned in June 1915, during World War I fights between Austrians and Russians. After World War II, the village went through gradual depopulation. In 1960, its population was 275, and by 1998, it shrank to 195.

Janikow has St. Anna parish church (1873), built in the location of the first, wooden church from the 16th century, which burned in the 1767 fire.
