= Prusy, Opatów County =

Prusy
- Village
- Location within Poland
- Coordinates: 50°48′48″N 21°41′41″E
- Country: Poland
- Voivodeship: Świętokrzyskie
- County: Opatów
- Gmina: Ożarów
- Population: 290

Prusy [ˈprusɨ] is a village in the administrative district of Gmina Ożarów, within Opatów County, Świętokrzyskie Voivodeship, in south-central Poland. It lies approximately 9 km (6 mi) south of Ożarów, 20 km (12 mi) east of Opatów, and 77 km (48 mi) east of the regional capital Kielce.
