= Grochocice =

- Village
- Location within Poland
- Coordinates: 50°48′51″N 21°37′55″E
- Country: Poland
- Voivodeship: Świętokrzyskie
- County: Opatów
- Gmina: Ożarów
- Population: 190

Grochocice [ɡrɔxɔˈt͡ɕit͡sɛ] is a village in the administrative district of Gmina Ożarów, within Opatów County, Świętokrzyskie Voivodeship, in south-central Poland. It lies approximately 9 km (6 mi) south of Ożarów, 15 km (9 mi) east of Opatów, and 72 km (45 mi) east of the regional capital Kielce.
