= Wólka Chrapanowska =

- Village
- Location within Poland
- Coordinates: 50°50′46″N 21°43′38″E
- Country: Poland
- Voivodeship: Świętokrzyskie
- County: Opatów
- Gmina: Ożarów
- Population: 110

Wólka Chrapanowska [ˈvulka xrapaˈnɔfska] is a village in the administrative district of Gmina Ożarów, within Opatów County, Świętokrzyskie Voivodeship, in south-central Poland. It lies approximately 7 km (4 mi) south-east of Ożarów, 22 km (14 mi) east of Opatów, and 79 km (49 mi) east of the regional capital Kielce.
