= Jakubowice, Opatów County =

Jakubowice
- Village
- Location within Poland
- Coordinates: 50°48′40″N 21°40′7″E
- Country: Poland
- Voivodeship: Świętokrzyskie
- County: Opatów
- Gmina: Ożarów
- Population: 320

Jakubowice [jakubɔˈvit͡sɛ] is a village in the administrative district of Gmina Ożarów, within Opatów County, Świętokrzyskie Voivodeship, in south-central Poland. It lies approximately 9 km (6 mi) south of Ożarów, 18 km (11 mi) east of Opatów, and 75 km (47 mi) east of the regional capital Kielce.
