= Nowe, Świętokrzyskie Voivodeship =

Nowe
- Village
- Location within Poland
- Coordinates: 50°55′37″N 21°48′10″E
- Country: Poland
- Voivodeship: Świętokrzyskie
- County: Opatów
- Gmina: Ożarów
- Population: 180

Nowe [ˈnɔvɛ] is a village in the administrative district of Gmina Ożarów, within Opatów County, Świętokrzyskie Voivodeship, in south-central Poland. It lies approximately 11 km (7 mi) north-east of Ożarów, 30 km (19 mi) north-east of Opatów, and 84 km (52 mi) east of the regional capital Kielce.
