= Potok, Opatów County =

Potok
- Village
- Location within Poland
- Coordinates: 50°56′45″N 21°39′11″E
- Country: Poland
- Voivodeship: Świętokrzyskie
- County: Opatów
- Gmina: Ożarów
- Population: 220

Potok [ˈpɔtɔk] is a village in the administrative district of Gmina Ożarów, within Opatów County, Świętokrzyskie Voivodeship, in south-central Poland. It lies approximately 7 km (4 mi) north of Ożarów, 23 km (14 mi) north-east of Opatów, and 74 km (46 mi) east of the regional capital Kielce.
