= Gliniany, Świętokrzyskie Voivodeship =

Gliniany
- Village
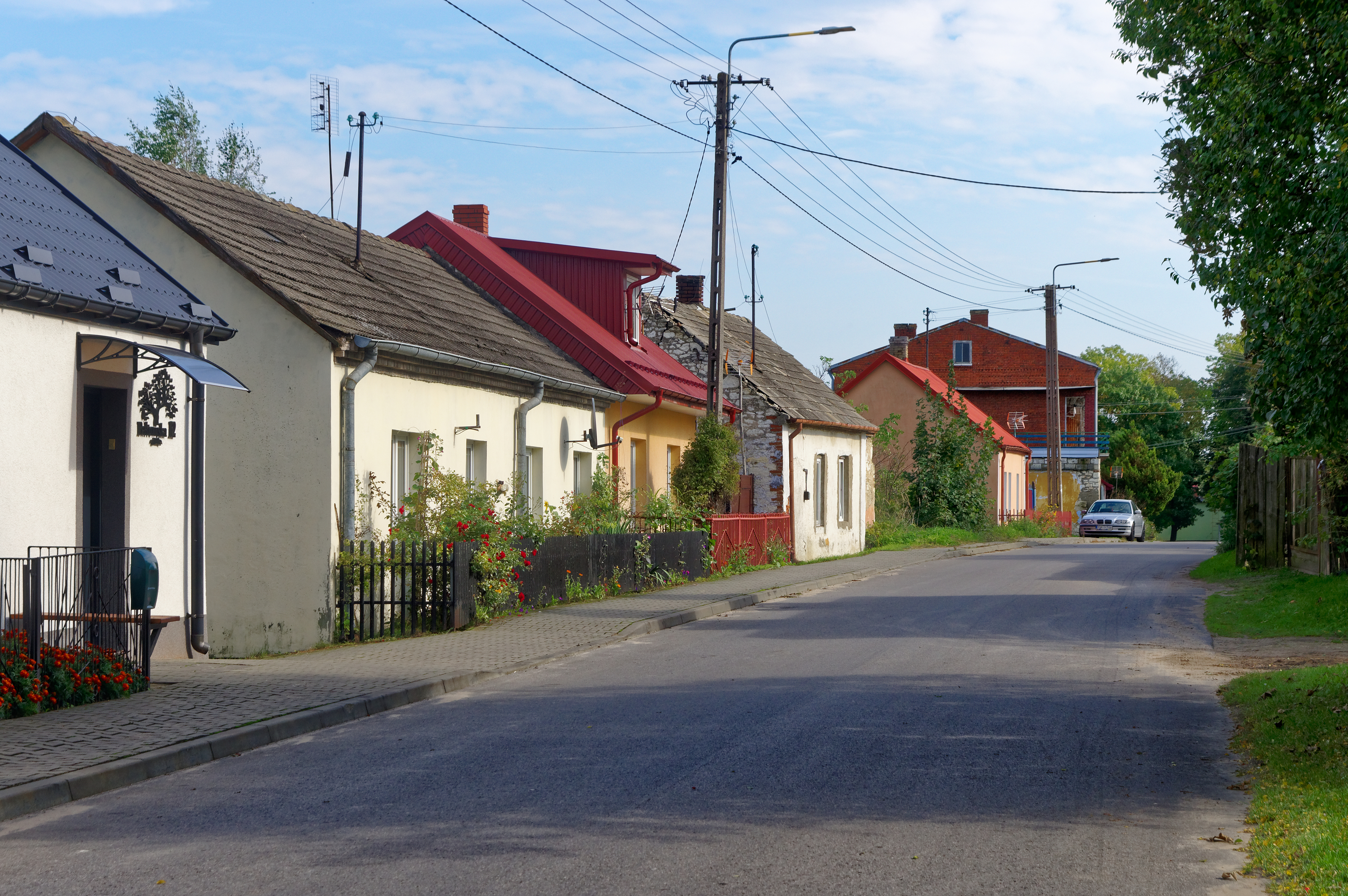

- Location within Poland
- Coordinates: 50°55′41″N 21°37′49″E
- Country: Poland
- Voivodeship: Świętokrzyskie
- County: Opatów
- Gmina: Ożarów
- Population: 320

Gliniany [ɡliˈɲanɨ] is a village in the administrative district of Gmina Ożarów, within Opatów County, Świętokrzyskie Voivodeship, in south-central Poland. It lies approximately 5 km (3 mi) north-west of Ożarów, 20 km (12 mi) north-east of Opatów, and 72 km (45 mi) east of the regional capital Kielce.

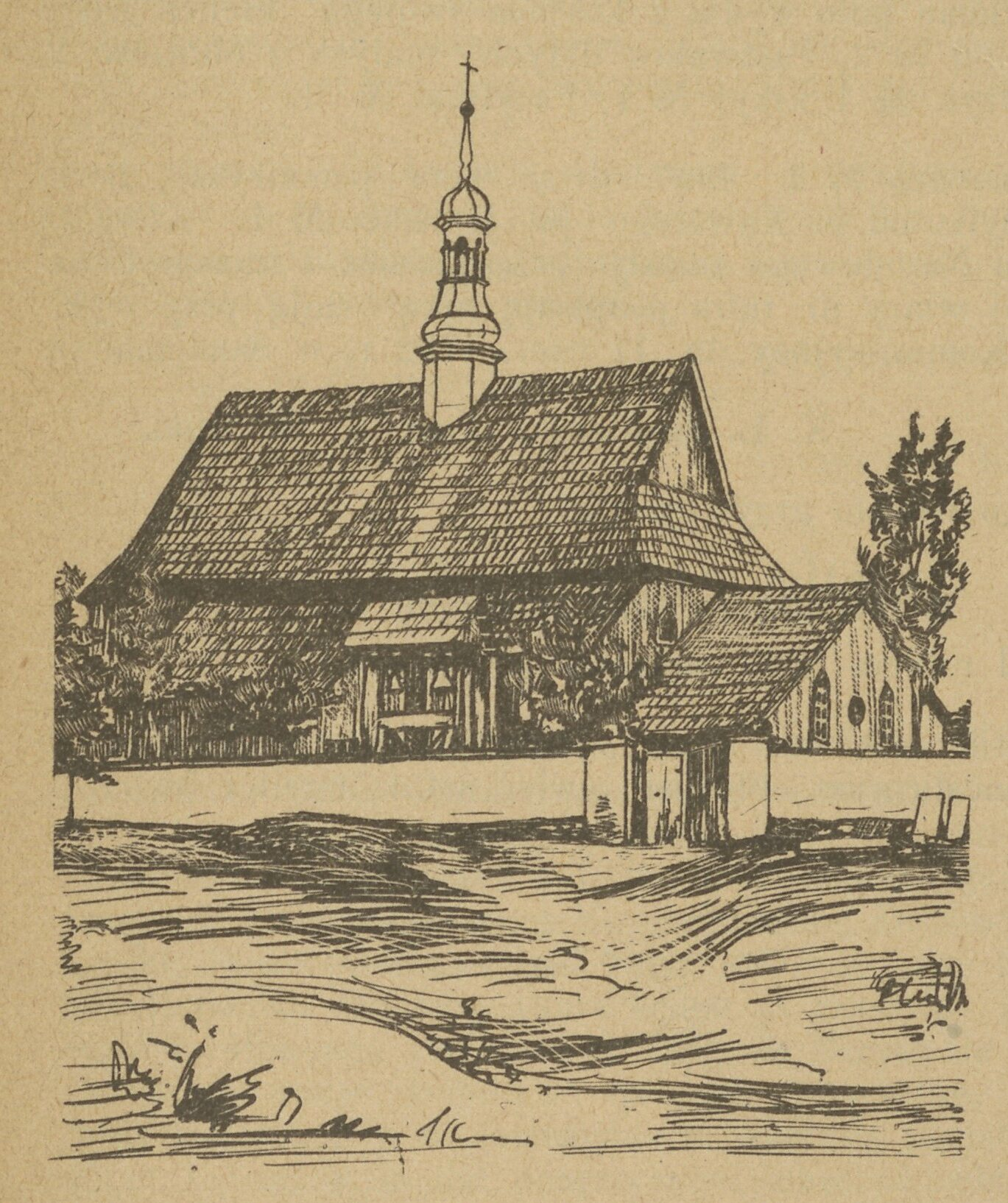
Church of Saint Adalbert before 1907
