= Wlonice, Gmina Ożarów =

Wlonice
- Village
- Location within Poland
- Coordinates: 50°54′58″N 21°43′30″E
- Country: Poland
- Voivodeship: Świętokrzyskie
- County: Opatów
- Gmina: Ożarów
- Population: 40

Wlonice [vlɔˈnit͡sɛ] is a village in the administrative district of Gmina Ożarów, within Opatów County, Świętokrzyskie Voivodeship, in south-central Poland. It lies approximately 5 km (3 mi) north-east of Ożarów, 25 km (16 mi) north-east of Opatów, and 78 km (48 mi) east of the regional capital Kielce.
