= Stróża, Świętokrzyskie Voivodeship =

Stróża
- Village
- Location within Poland
- Coordinates: 50°53′46″N 21°38′32″E
- Country: Poland
- Voivodeship: Świętokrzyskie
- County: Opatów
- Gmina: Ożarów
- Population: 110

Stróża [ˈstruʐa] is a village in the administrative district of Gmina Ożarów, within Opatów County, Świętokrzyskie Voivodeship, in south-central Poland. It lies approximately 2 km (1 mi) west of Ożarów, 19 km (12 mi) north-east of Opatów, and 73 km (45 mi) east of the regional capital Kielce.
