= Sobótka, Opatów County =

Sobótka
- Village
- Location within Poland
- Coordinates: 50°47′45″N 21°40′30″E
- Country: Poland
- Voivodeship: Świętokrzyskie
- County: Opatów
- Gmina: Ożarów

Population
  - Total: 630
- Time zone: UTC+1 (CET)
  - Summer (DST): UTC+2 (CEST)
- Vehicle registration: TOP

Sobótka [sɔˈbutka] is a village in the administrative district of Gmina Ożarów, within Opatów County, Świętokrzyskie Voivodeship, in south-central Poland. It lies approximately 11 km (7 mi) south of Ożarów, 18 km (11 mi) east of Opatów, and 76 km (47 mi) east of the regional capital Kielce.

== History ==
Six Polish citizens were murdered by Nazi Germany in the village during World War II.
