= Karsy, Opatów County =

Karsy
- Village
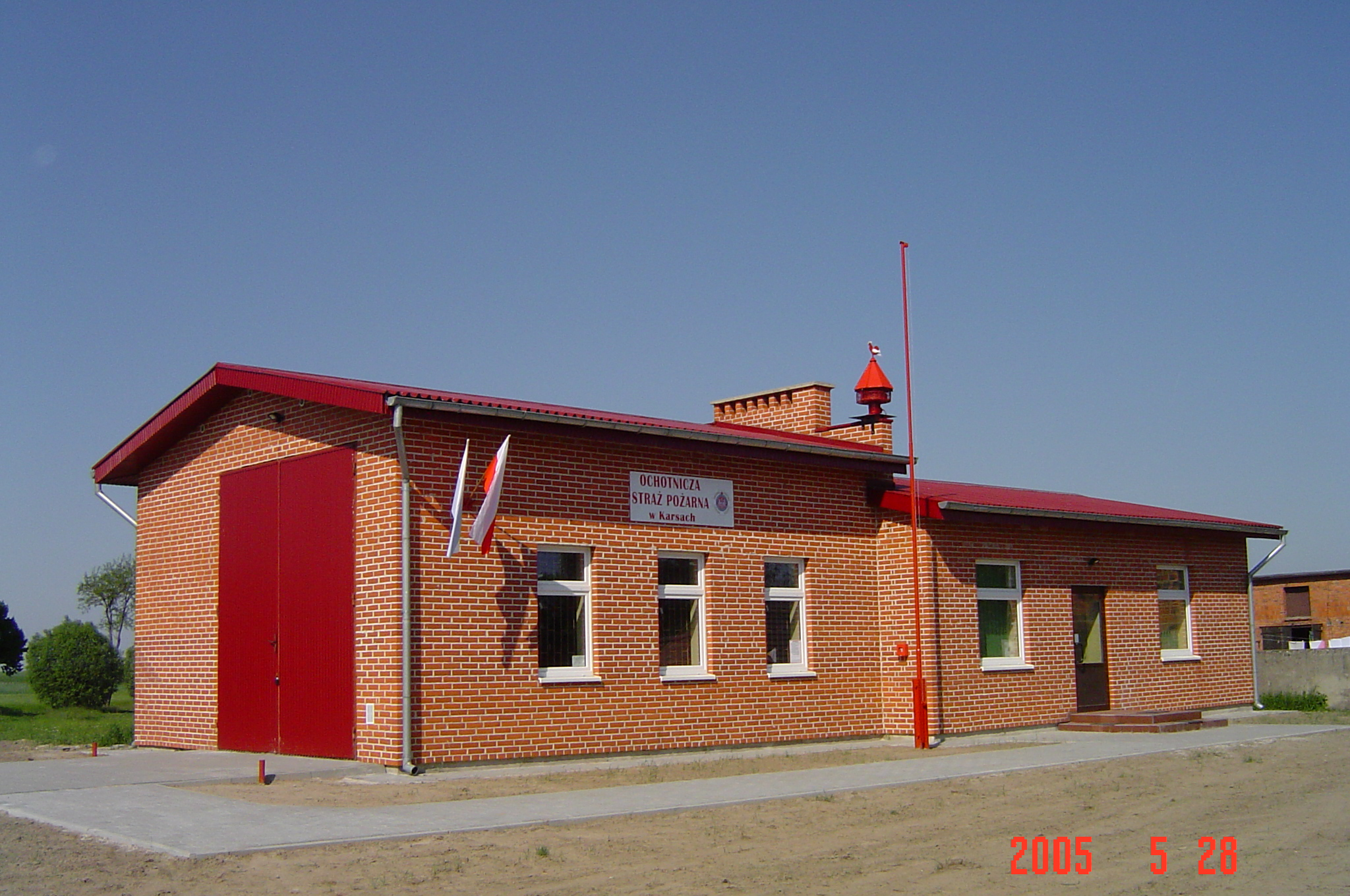
- Fire station

- Location within Poland
- Coordinates: 50°54′9″N 21°40′51″E
- Country: Poland
- Voivodeship: Świętokrzyskie
- County: Opatów
- Gmina: Ożarów
- Population: 220

Karsy [ˈkarsɨ] is a village in the administrative district of Gmina Ożarów, within Opatów County, Świętokrzyskie Voivodeship, in south-central Poland. It lies approximately 2 km (1 mi) north-east of Ożarów, 21 km (13 mi) north-east of Opatów, and 75 km (47 mi) east of the regional capital Kielce.
