= Dębno, Opatów County =

Dębno
- Village
- Location within Poland
- Coordinates: 50°52′59″N 21°47′13″E
- Country: Poland
- Voivodeship: Świętokrzyskie
- County: Opatów
- Gmina: Ożarów
- Population: 160

Dębno [ˈdɛmbnɔ] is a village in the administrative district of Gmina Ożarów, within Opatów County, Świętokrzyskie Voivodeship, in south-central Poland. It lies approximately 9 km (6 mi) east of Ożarów, 27 km (17 mi) east of Opatów, and 83 km (52 mi) east of the regional capital Kielce.
