= Szymanówka =

- Village
- Location within Poland
- Coordinates: 50°52′52″N 21°43′47″E
- Country: Poland
- Voivodeship: Świętokrzyskie
- County: Opatów
- Gmina: Ożarów
- Population: 100

Szymanówka (Polish pronunciation: [ʂɨmaˈnufka]) is a village in the administrative district of Gmina Ożarów, within Opatów County, Świętokrzyskie Voivodeship, in south-central Poland. It lies approximately 5 km (3 mi) east of Ożarów, 24 km (15 mi) east of Opatów, and 79 km (49 mi) east of the regional capital Kielce.
