= Lasocin, Opatów County =

Lasocin
- Village
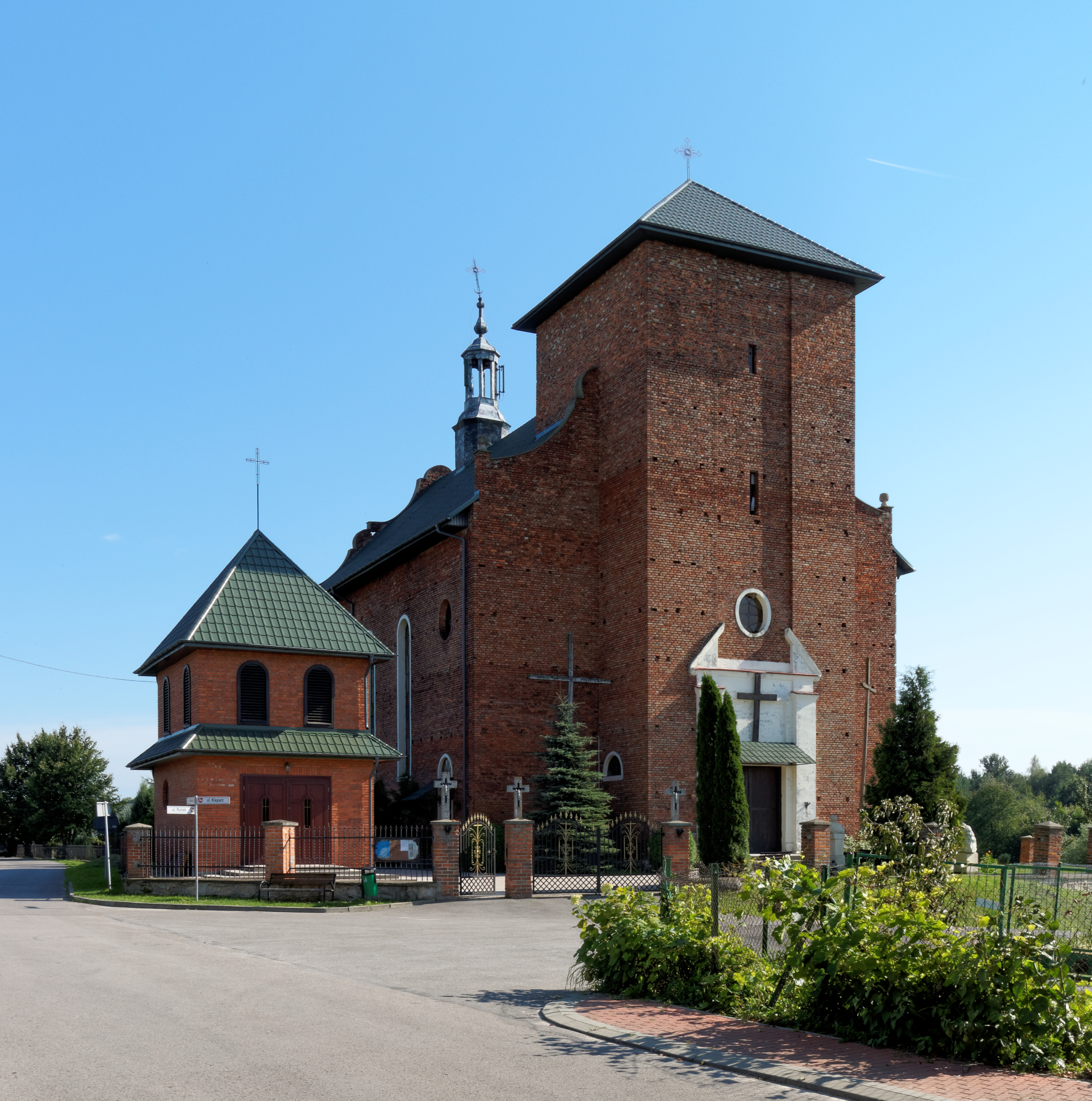
- Catholic church

- Location within Poland
- Coordinates: 50°53′49″N 21°45′26″E
- Country: Poland
- Voivodeship: Świętokrzyskie
- County: Opatów
- Gmina: Ożarów
- Population: 318

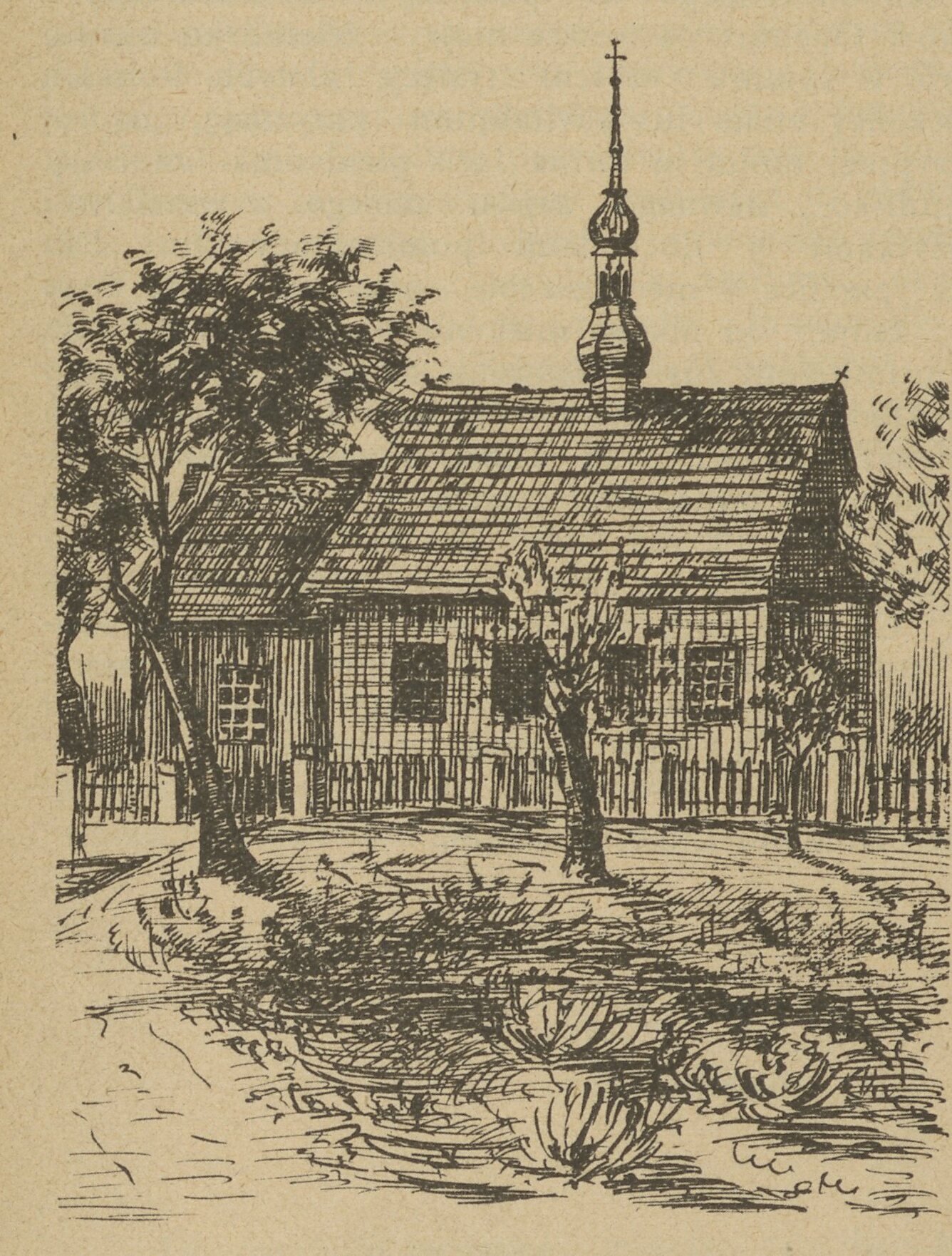
Old St. Michael the Archangel's Church, before 1907

Lasocin [laˈsɔt͡ɕin] is a village in the administrative district of Gmina Ożarów, within Opatów County, Świętokrzyskie Voivodeship, in south-central Poland. It lies in Lesser Poland, approximately 7 km (4 mi) east of Ożarów, 26 km (16 mi) north-east of Opatów, and 81 km (50 mi) east of the regional capital Kielce. The village used to be a town from 1547 to 1869.

Lasocin lies at the foothills of the Swietokrzyskie Mountains, among hills and valleys, five kilometers from the Vistula river. The village is located two kilometers south of National Road Nr. 74, which goes from Kielce to Zamość. Lasocin is made of several smaller settlements: Blonia, Kolonie Lasocinskie, Nowy Lasocin and Lasocin Poduchowny. It has a market square, a few streets, a school, a library, stores and several enterprises.

The history of the village dates back to the year 1547, when it was founded by a local nobleman Andrzej Lasota, in a forest which was part of the ancient village of Debno. Lasocin was granted Magdeburg rights by King Zygmunt August, upon request of Lasota, who named the town after himself. In the late 16th century, the town became associated with the Polish Brethren, as the Lasota family, which owned Lasocin until 1592, promoted the Protestant Reformation. After the Lasotas, the town belonged to the Olesnicki family. In 1662, Zbigniew Olesnicki, the castellan of Wislica and the starosta of Opoczno funded here a Roman Catholic parish church. The church was blessed on August 20, 1664, by Bishop of Kraków Mikolaj Oborski.

Until the Partitions of Poland Lasocin was part of the Sandomierz Voivodeship. In 1815 - 1915, it belonged to Russian-controlled Congress Poland, and remained in private hands until the mid-19th century. Its residents mostly supported themselves as farmers, there also were some lumberjacks, who cut down trees for timber used by the Vistula river port at nearby Sulejow. Furthermore, in the early 19th century the town was a local center of weaving. Following many other locations of northern Lesser Poland, Lasocin lost its town charter in 1869, as a reprisal of Russian authorities for the residents’ support of the January Uprising.

Among points of interest there is a neo-romantic church of Michael Archangel (1930s), with a Baroque altar (1700), which had been moved from an earlier, wooden church.
