= Niemcówka =

- Village
- Location within Poland
- Coordinates: 50°51′31″N 21°45′27″E
- Country: Poland
- Voivodeship: Świętokrzyskie
- County: Opatów
- Gmina: Ożarów
- Population: 80

Niemcówka [ɲɛmˈt͡sufka] is a village in the administrative district of Gmina Ożarów, within Opatów County, Świętokrzyskie Voivodeship, in south-central Poland. It lies approximately 8 km (5 mi) south-east of Ożarów, 25 km (16 mi) east of Opatów, and 81 km (50 mi) east of the regional capital Kielce.
