= Janów, Gmina Ożarów =

Janów
- Village
- Location within Poland
- Coordinates: 50°55′24″N 21°46′2″E
- Country: Poland
- Voivodeship: Świętokrzyskie
- County: Opatów
- Gmina: Ożarów
- Population: 80

Janów [ˈjanuf] is a village in the administrative district of Gmina Ożarów, within Opatów County, Świętokrzyskie Voivodeship, in south-central Poland. It lies approximately 8 km (5 mi) north-east of Ożarów, 28 km (17 mi) north-east of Opatów, and 81 km (50 mi) east of the regional capital Kielce.
