= Janowice, Opatów County =

Janowice
- Village
- Location within Poland
- Coordinates: 50°48′55″N 21°39′1″E
- Country: Poland
- Voivodeship: Świętokrzyskie
- County: Opatów
- Gmina: Ożarów
- Population: 200

Janowice [janɔˈvit͡sɛ] is a village in the administrative district of Gmina Ożarów, within Opatów County, Świętokrzyskie Voivodeship, in south-central Poland. It lies approximately 9 km (6 mi) south of Ożarów, 16 km (10 mi) east of Opatów, and 74 km (46 mi) east of the regional capital Kielce.
