= Przybysławice, Opatów County =

Przybysławice
- Village
- Location within Poland
- Coordinates: 50°49′50″N 21°40′14″E
- Country: Poland
- Voivodeship: Świętokrzyskie
- County: Opatów
- Gmina: Ożarów

Population
  - Total: 200

Przybysławice [pʂɨbɨswaˈvit͡sɛ] is a village in the administrative district of Gmina Ożarów, within Opatów County, Świętokrzyskie Voivodeship, in south-central Poland. It lies approximately 7 km (4 mi) south of Ożarów, 18 km (11 mi) east of Opatów, and 75 km (47 mi) east of the regional capital Kielce.

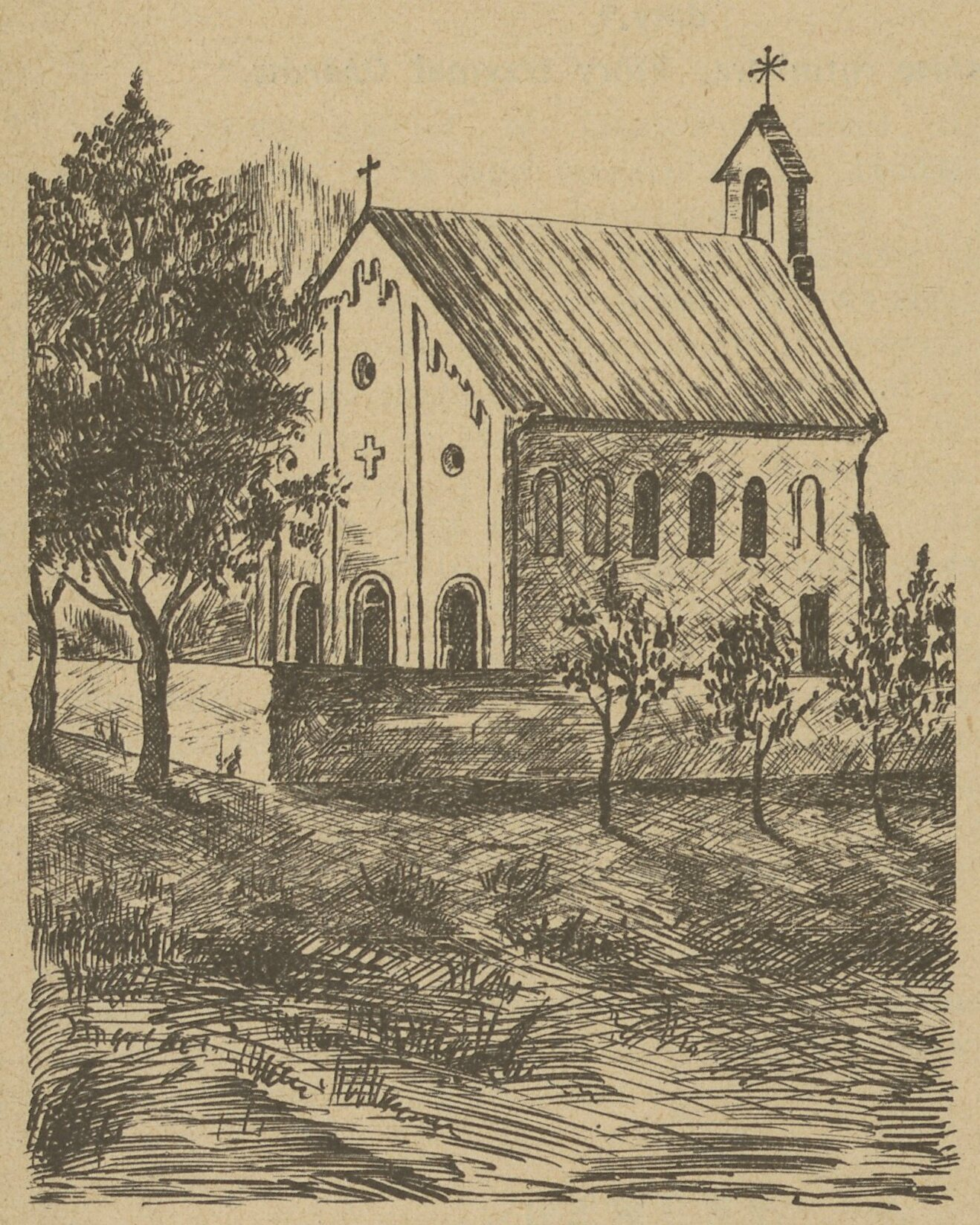
Transfiguration of Our Lord church, before 1907
