= Zawada, Opatów County =

Zawada
- Village
- Location within Poland
- Coordinates: 50°51′50″N 21°40′53″E
- Country: Poland
- Voivodeship: Świętokrzyskie
- County: Opatów
- Gmina: Ożarów
- Population: 200

Zawada [zaˈvada] is a village in the administrative district of Gmina Ożarów, within Opatów County, Świętokrzyskie Voivodeship, in south-central Poland. It lies approximately 4 km (2 mi) south of Ożarów, 20 km (12 mi) east of Opatów, and 75 km (47 mi) east of the regional capital Kielce.
