= Sobów =

- Village
- Location within Poland
- Coordinates: 50°53′7″N 21°41′7″E
- Country: Poland
- Voivodeship: Świętokrzyskie
- County: Opatów
- Gmina: Ożarów
- Population: 390

Sobów [ˈsɔbuf] is a village in the administrative district of Gmina Ożarów, within Opatów County, Świętokrzyskie Voivodeship, in south-central Poland. It lies approximately 2 km (1 mi) south-east of Ożarów, 21 km (13 mi) north-east of Opatów, and 76 km (47 mi) east of the regional capital Kielce.
