= Biedrzychów, Świętokrzyskie Voivodeship =

Biedrzychów
- Village
- Location within Poland
- Coordinates: 50°54′2″N 21°47′43″E
- Country: Poland
- Voivodeship: Świętokrzyskie
- County: Opatów
- Gmina: Ożarów
- Population: 78 (2,011)

Biedrzychów [bjɛˈdʐɨxuf] is a village in the administrative district of Gmina Ożarów, within Opatów County, Świętokrzyskie Voivodeship, in south-central Poland. It lies approximately 10 km (6 mi) east of Ożarów, 29 km (18 mi) east of Opatów, and 83 km (52 mi) east of the regional capital Kielce.
