= Śródborze, Świętokrzyskie Voivodeship =

Śródborze
- Village
- Location within Poland
- Coordinates: 50°54′17″N 21°35′52″E
- Country: Poland
- Voivodeship: Świętokrzyskie
- County: Opatów
- Gmina: Ożarów
- Population: 140

Śródborze [ɕrudˈbɔʐɛ] is a village in the administrative district of Gmina Ożarów, within Opatów County, Świętokrzyskie Voivodeship, in south-central Poland. It lies approximately 6 km (4 mi) west of Ożarów, 17 km (11 mi) north-east of Opatów, and 69 km (43 mi) east of the regional capital Kielce.
