= Janopol, Świętokrzyskie Voivodeship =

Janopol
- Village
- Location within Poland
- Coordinates: 50°54′21″N 21°42′57″E
- Country: Poland
- Voivodeship: Świętokrzyskie
- County: Opatów
- Gmina: Ożarów

Janopol [jaˈnɔpɔl] is a village in the administrative district of Gmina Ożarów, within Opatów County, Świętokrzyskie Voivodeship, in south-central Poland. It lies approximately 4 km (2 mi) north-east of Ożarów, 24 km (15 mi) north-east of Opatów, and 78 km (48 mi) east of the regional capital Kielce.
