= Kruków, Świętokrzyskie Voivodeship =

Kruków
- Village
- Location within Poland
- Coordinates: 50°53′N 21°43′E
- Country: Poland
- Voivodeship: Świętokrzyskie
- County: Opatów
- Gmina: Ożarów

Kruków [ˈkrukuf] is a village in the administrative district of Gmina Ożarów, within Opatów County, Świętokrzyskie Voivodeship, in south-central Poland. It lies approximately 4 km (2 mi) east of Ożarów, 23 km (14 mi) north-east of Opatów, and 78 km (48 mi) east of the regional capital Kielce.
