= Pisary, Świętokrzyskie Voivodeship =

Pisary
- Village
- Location within Poland
- Coordinates: 50°48′7″N 21°42′20″E
- Country: Poland
- Voivodeship: Świętokrzyskie
- County: Opatów
- Gmina: Ożarów

Pisary [piˈsarɨ] is a village in the administrative district of Gmina Ożarów, within Opatów County, Świętokrzyskie Voivodeship, in south-central Poland. It lies approximately 11 km (7 mi) south of Ożarów, 20 km (12 mi) east of Opatów, and 78 km (48 mi) east of the regional capital Kielce.
