= Czachów, Świętokrzyskie Voivodeship =

Czachów
- Village
- Location within Poland
- Coordinates: 50°54′34″N 21°42′17″E
- Country: Poland
- Voivodeship: Świętokrzyskie
- County: Opatów
- Gmina: Ożarów
- Population: 240

Czachów [ˈt͡ʂaxuf] is a village in the administrative district of Gmina Ożarów, within Opatów County, Świętokrzyskie Voivodeship, in south-central Poland. It lies approximately 4 km (2 mi) north-east of Ożarów, 23 km (14 mi) north-east of Opatów, and 77 km (48 mi) east of the regional capital Kielce.
