= Sara Horowitz (disambiguation) =

Sara Horowitz or Sara Hurwitz may also refer to:

- Sara Horowitz (born 1963), American union activist.
- Sara R. Horowitz (born 1951), American Holocaust literary scholar
- Sara Hurwitz, first American Orthodox woman rabbi
- Sarah Hurwitz (fl. 2008–2019), American speechwriter
- Sarah Horowitz-Sternfeld (1838-1937), notable Hasidic personality
