= Wojciechówka, Świętokrzyskie Voivodeship =

Wojciechówka
- Village
- Location within Poland
- Coordinates: 50°54′12″N 21°37′4″E
- Country: Poland
- Voivodeship: Świętokrzyskie
- County: Opatów
- Gmina: Ożarów

Wojciechówka (Polish pronunciation: [vɔjt͡ɕɛˈxufka]) is a village in the administrative district of Gmina Ożarów, within Opatów County, Świętokrzyskie Voivodeship, in south-central Poland. It lies approximately 4 km (2 mi) west of Ożarów, 18 km (11 mi) north-east of Opatów, and 71 km (44 mi) east of the regional capital Kielce.
