= Moshe Yechiel Epstein =

Israeli Rabbi

Rabbi Moshe Yechiel Epstein
- משה יחיאל הלוי אפשטיין

Personal life
- Born: 29 December 1889
- Died: 27 January 1971 (aged 81) Tel Aviv, Israel
- Notable work(s): Eish Dos, Be'er Moshe
- Occupation: Rebbe, Torah scholar

Religious life
- Religion: Judaism
- Denomination: Hasidic
- Sect: Ozharov-Chentshin

Senior posting
- Successor: Grand Rabbi Tanchum Becker
- Awards: Israel Prize (1968)

Moshe Yechiel Epstein (Hebrew: משה יחיאל הלוי אפשטיין; 29 December 1889 - 27 January 1971) was the Ozharover Rebbe, and an Israel Prize recipient in the category of Rabbinical literature in 1968. Prior to this, in 1967, he was elected chairman of Agudat Yisrael's Council of Torah Sages.

== Background ==
Rabbi Moshe Yechiel Epstein first came to America in 1920 as part of a delegation from Agudas Yisroel, to raise money to help the Jewish refugees in Poland, which had been a major battleground between the Germans, Austrians, and Russians during World War I. While gone, Rabbi Moshe Yechiel's brother started to "fir rabbanus" in Ozherov, and made himself popular. When he returned and saw that people really liked his brother, he decided not to make a controversy, and took over as rabbi of the smaller Polish town of Otwock.

== Polish antisemitism ==
Shortly thereafter, Rabbi Moshe Yechiel was traveling on a train when a Polish man started up with him and spat on him. Rabbi Moshe Yechiel had been offered to be the rabbi of a synagogue for Ozerov immigrants on the Lower East Side of Manhattan, and this incident—indicative of the treatment of Jews by the Polish people—was the impetus for him to apply to immigrate to the United States. After being rejected a first time, he was granted permission the second time and moved his Hasidic court to New York City in 1926. Rabbi Moshe Yechiel spent several years on the Lower East Side, and then moved to the Bronx.

== Holocaust ==
Rabbi Moshe Yechiel's entire family in Europe was wiped out in the Holocaust. After World War II the remnants of the chasidim of Chentshin were left leaderless, their rebbe having been killed by the Nazis. They adopted the Ozherover Rebbe, a grandson of the first Chentshiner Rebbe, as their leader. Rabbi Moshe Yechiel was therefore given the title Grand Rabbi of Ozherov-Chentshin.

Excited by the new state of Israel, Rabbi Moshe Yechiel moved to Tel Aviv in 1952, where he spent the rest of his life.

== Torah scholar ==
Rabbi Moshe Yechiel was known as one of the great Torah scholars of his generation. His encyclopedic series of Torah commentaries entitled Eish Dos (11 volumes) and Be'er Moshe (12 volumes) are renowned for their depth. They were considered to be just a small sample of the Rebbe's erudition.

Rabbi Moshe Yechiel died in 1971, and was succeeded by his grandson, Grand Rabbi Tanchum Becker (son of Rabbi Moshe Yechiel's daughter, Rebbetzin Miriam Becker and Rabbi Dovid Eliyahu Becker, a rav in Milwaukee, Wisconsin), the present Rebbe of Ozerov-Chentshin, who was trained by his grandfather to succeed him. Grand Rabbi Becker presently resides with his family in Bnei Brak, where he leads the Ozerov Torah Center, comprising a yeshiva, a kollel for married Talmudic scholars, and the Ozerover Beis Medrash.
