= Jankowice =

Jankowice may refer to the following villages in Poland:

- Jankowice, Pszczyna County in Silesian Voivodeship (south Poland)
- Jankowice, Lower Silesian Voivodeship (south-west Poland)
- Jankowice, Kuyavian-Pomeranian Voivodeship (north-central Poland)
- Jankowice, Lublin Voivodeship (east Poland)
- Jankowice, Brzeziny County in Łódź Voivodeship (central Poland)
- Jankowice, Kutno County in Łódź Voivodeship (central Poland)
- Jankowice, Radomsko County in Łódź Voivodeship (central Poland)
- Jankowice, Chrzanów County in Lesser Poland Voivodeship (south Poland)
- Jankowice, Proszowice County in Lesser Poland Voivodeship (south Poland)
- Jankowice, Subcarpathian Voivodeship (south-east Poland)
- Jankowice, Świętokrzyskie Voivodeship (south-central Poland)
- Jankowice, Grójec County in Masovian Voivodeship (east-central Poland)
- Jankowice, Radom County in Masovian Voivodeship (east-central Poland)
- Jankowice, Szydłowiec County in Masovian Voivodeship (east-central Poland)
- Jankowice, Greater Poland Voivodeship (west-central Poland)
- Jankowice, Racibórz County in Silesian Voivodeship (south Poland)
- Jankowice, Działdowo County in Warmian-Masurian Voivodeship (north Poland)
- Jankowice, Kętrzyn County in Warmian-Masurian Voivodeship (north Poland)

== See also ==
- Jenkovce, Slovakia
