= Biedrzychów =

Biedrzychów may refer to the following places in Poland:

- Biedrzychów, Lower Silesian Voivodeship, (south-west Poland)
- Biedrzychów, Świętokrzyskie Voivodeship, (south-central Poland)
