= Gmina Ożarów =

Gmina Ożarów Ożarów Commune
- Gmina
- Flag Coat of arms
- Interactive map of Gmina Ożarów
- Coordinates (Ożarów): 50°53′27″N 21°40′4″E
- Country: Poland
- Voivodeship: Świętokrzyskie
- County: Opatów
- Seat: Ożarów

Area
  - Total: 183.29 km^{2} (70.77 sq mi)

Population (2006)
  - Total: 11,452
  - Density: 62.480/km^{2} (161.82/sq mi)
  - Urban: 4,816
  - Rural: 6,636
- Website: http://www.ozarow.pl/

Gmina Ożarów is an urban-rural gmina (administrative district) in Opatów County, Świętokrzyskie Voivodeship, in south-central Poland. Its seat is the town of Ożarów, which lies approximately 20 kilometres (12 mi) north-east of Opatów and 74 km (46 mi) east of the regional capital Kielce.

The gmina covers an area of 183.29 square kilometres (70.8 sq mi), and as of 2006 its total population is 11,452 (out of which the population of Ożarów amounts to 4,816, and the population of the rural part of the gmina is 6,636).

== Villages ==
Apart from the town of Ożarów, Gmina Ożarów contains the villages and settlements of Biedrzychów, Binkowice, Czachów, Dębno, Gliniany, Grochocice, Jakubowice, Janików, Jankowice, Janopol, Janów, Janowice, Julianów, Karsy, Kruków, Lasocin, Maruszów, Niemcówka, Nowe, Pisary, Polesie Mikułowskie, Potok, Potok-Kolonia, Prusy, Przybysławice, Śmiłów, Sobótka, Sobów, Śródborze, Stróża, Suchodółka, Szymanówka, Tominy, Wlonice, Wojciechówka, Wólka Chrapanowska, Wyszmontów and Zawada.

== Neighbouring gminas ==
Gmina Ożarów is bordered by the gminas of Annopol, Ćmielów, Dwikozy, Tarłów, Wilczyce, Wojciechowice and Zawichost.
