= Janopol =

Janopol may refer to the following places:

- Janopol, Greater Poland Voivodeship (west-central Poland)
- Janopol, Lublin Voivodeship (east Poland)
- Janopol, Świętokrzyskie Voivodeship (south-central Poland)
