= Czachów =

Czachów may refer to the following places:

- Czachów, Masovian Voivodeship (east-central Poland)
- Czachów, Świętokrzyskie Voivodeship (south-central Poland)
- Czachów, West Pomeranian Voivodeship (north-west Poland)
