= Wojciechówka =

Wojciechówka may refer to the following places:

- Wojciechówka, Gmina Tyszowce, Tomaszów County in Lublin Voivodeship (east Poland)
- Wojciechówka, Subcarpathian Voivodeship (south-east Poland)
- Wojciechówka, Świętokrzyskie Voivodeship (south-central Poland)
- Wojciechówka, Gmina Białobrzegi in Masovian Voivodeship (east-central Poland)
- Wojciechówka, Gmina Promna in Masovian Voivodeship (east-central Poland)
- Wojciechówka, Mińsk County in Masovian Voivodeship (east-central Poland)
- Wojciechówka, Zwoleń County in Masovian Voivodeship (east-central Poland)
- Wojciechówka, Greater Poland Voivodeship (west-central Poland)
