= Śródborze =

Śródborze may refer to the following places:

- Śródborze, Ciechanów County in Masovian Voivodeship (east-central Poland)
- Śródborze, Płońsk County in Masovian Voivodeship (east-central Poland)
- Śródborze, Świętokrzyskie Voivodeship (south-central Poland)
