= Krukow =

Krukow or Kruków may refer to:

Places in Germany

- Krukow, Mecklenburg-Vorpommern, a village in Mecklenburg-Vorpommern
- Krukow, Schleswig-Holstein, a municipality in Schleswig-Holstein

Places in Poland

- Kruków, Lower Silesian Voivodeship (south-west Poland)
- Kruków, Lublin Voivodeship (east Poland)
- Kruków, Świętokrzyskie Voivodeship (south-central Poland)

People

- Mike Krukow, American baseball player and television commentator

== See also ==
- Kruckow
