= Pisary =

Pisary may refer to the following places in Poland:

- Pisary, Lower Silesian Voivodeship (south-west Poland)
- Pisary, Lesser Poland Voivodeship (south Poland)
- Pisary, Świętokrzyskie Voivodeship (south-central Poland)
