= Chentshin =

Polish Hasidic dynasty

Chentshin is the name of a Polish Hasidic dynasty founded by the Rebbe Chayim Shmuel Szternfeld. Chentshin is the Yiddish name of Chęciny, a town in present-day Poland.

Rebbe Szternfeld was a great-grandson of the Chozeh of Lublin. He was known for his great love for the Land of Israel and he kept a clock in his house which told local time in the Land of Israel.

The mantle of rebbe was eventually adopted by the Ozherov rebbe, so that Rabbi Moshe Yechiel Halevi Epstein (previous) and Rabbi Tanchum Becker (current) are the rebbes of Ozherov-Chenchin. Rabbi Pinchus Elchonon Mandelbaum (current) Rabbe of Chenchin in America Montebello N.Y. A Grandson of Rabbi Yosef Baruch Glickman-Rubin who was a Grandson of Rabbe Yehoshua Heshel of Chentshin the oldest son of Rebbe Chayim Shmuel of chentshin

Rabbi Moshe Yechiel Epstein's father was a son-in-law of Rebbe Chayim Shmuel of Chentshin.

== See also ==
- Sarah Horowitz-Sternfeld, the Chentshiner Rebbetzin
