= St. Martin's Collegiate Church, Opatów =

Church in Opatów, Poland

Coordinates: 50°48′09″N 21°25′16″E

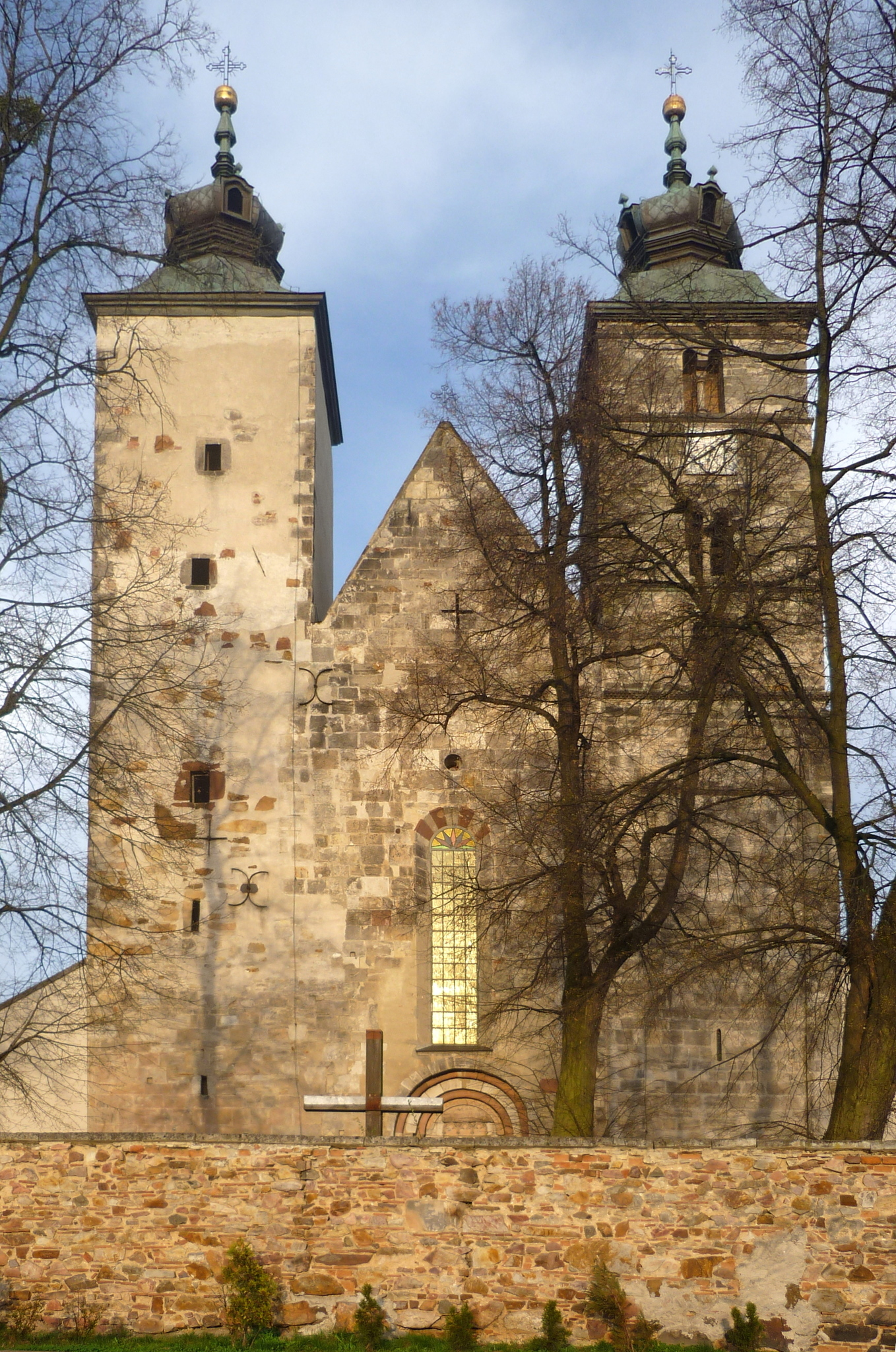

The Collegiate church of Saint Martin in Opatow is the Romanesque church of Saint Martin of Tours placed in Opatów, in Świętokrzyskie Voivodeship in Poland. It is the most valuable monument in Opatow, and has been described as one of the most precious relics of Roman architecture in Poland. In 2023, the church was designated an official Polish Historic Monument.

== History ==
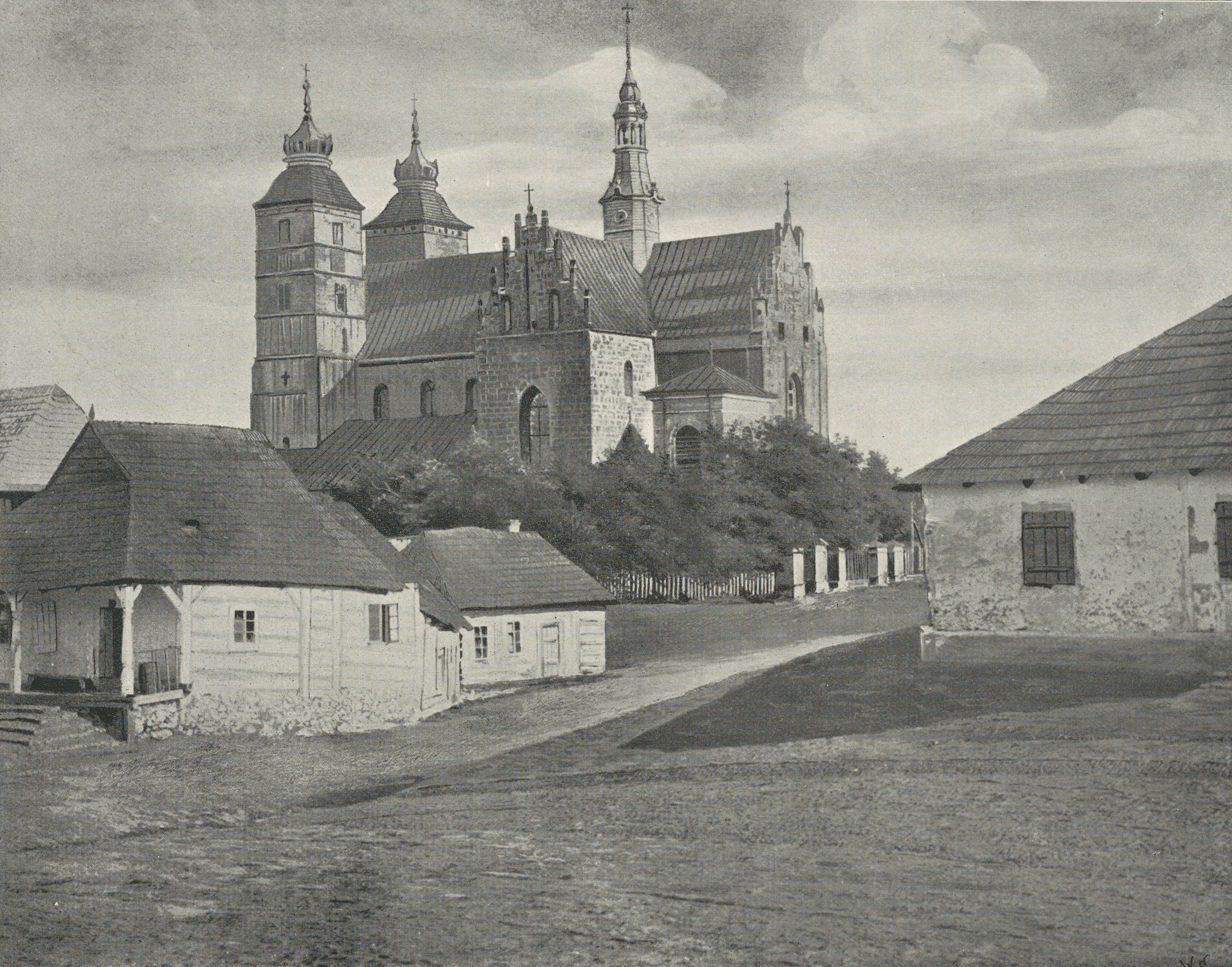
View of the collegiate church before 1899

The church possesses the status of collegiate church: the first mention by canons from Opatów comes from the year 1206. It is not known who was the real founder of this temple. Several people claim, according to Jan Długosz, that the son of Bolesław Krzywousty, the duke Henryk Sandomierski and crusader, built the monastery for use by Knights Templar from Jerusalem. Others attribute the church to the Cistercians, the Benedictines, or to Alojzy Dunin, the son of famous Peter.

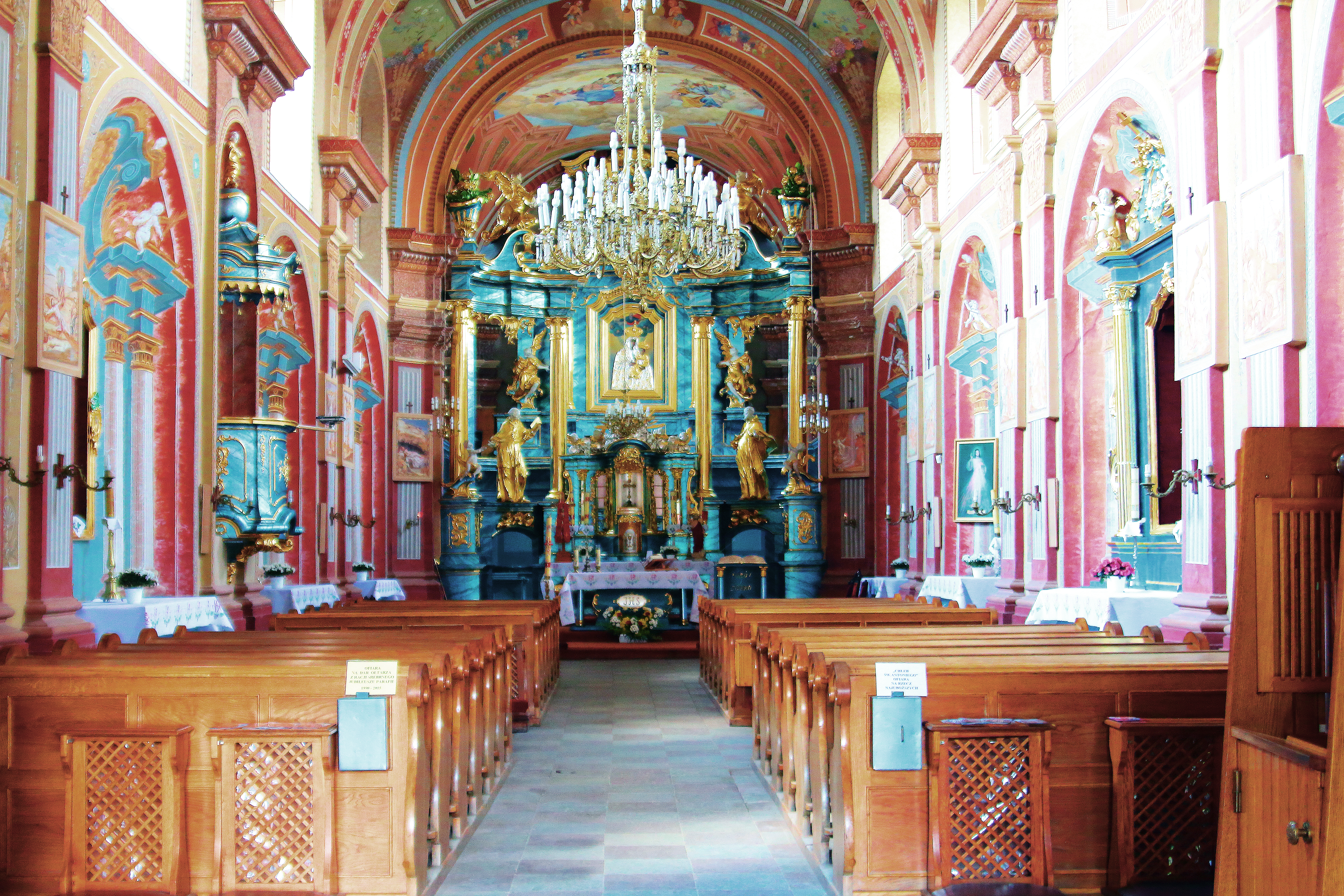
Interior, Church of St. Martin

The temple is built in the Romanesque style, and it contains many Gothic elements as well as later Renaissance and baroque details. There are two towers from the western side. The south, Romanesque one, built of the stone cut, it marks out with Romanesque little windows. Second tower, built later, has a simpler shape. There is a Romanesque main portal between the towers with a Gothic portal placed on it. Next to the portal, there are traces of covered entry are with three arcades. The Romanesque portal remained also in northern church-porch, which contains a Gothic-Renaissance portal from 1514. It became decorated with floral motives, in which the coats of arms "Swan" and "Odrowąż" were put in the composition . The former Romanesque little windows in the side naves of collegiate church are covered. There are covered Romanesque little windows in the side naves of the collegiate church. The main aisle of building comes probably from XVI age. It is covered by late-Gothic barrel vault. It has replaced a primitive wooden ceiling. The interior of church is covered by the baroque polychrome from XVIII age. The historic paintings are visible in the walls of presbytery. The walls of main aisle, over arcades, were covered with the allegorical scenes, and on the vault, there are scenes from St. Martin's life. The equipment of interior of collegiate church comes from XVIII age. In the altar on the prolongation of right south nave there is the painting of Divine Mother with Jesus from XVI age.
