= Sara R. Horowitz =

American Holocaust literary scholar

- Born: 1951 (age 74–75)

Academic background
- Education: MA, English literature, Columbia University; MA, French literature, PhD, comparative literature, Brandeis University
- Thesis: Linguistic displacement in fictional responses to the Holocaust: Kosinski, Wiesel, Lind, and Tournier (1984)

Academic work
- Discipline: Literature
- Sub-discipline: Comparative Literature and Jewish Studies
- Institutions: University of Delaware; York University

Sara Reva Horowitz (born 1951) is an American scholar of Holocaust literary. She is a professor of Comparative Literature and Humanities and a former Director of the Israel and Golda Koschitzky Centre for Jewish Studies at York University. She is also serves on the academic advisory board of the United States Holocaust Memorial Museum.

== Education ==
Horowitz earned her Master of Arts from Columbia University. In 1982, she received the Mary Isabel Sibley Fellowship from Phi Beta Kappa. She later completed her PhD at Brandeis University.

== Career ==
In 1992, Horowitz and Rabbi Gilah Langner founded Kerem: A Journal of Creative Explorations in Judaism. While serving as an associate professor at the University of Delaware, Horowitz also directed its Jewish Studies Program. In 1995, she co-edited Jewish American Women Writers, which won the Judaica Reference Book Award that year. Two years later, she wrote Voicing the Void: Muteness and Memory in Holocaust Fiction, which received the 1997 Choice: Current Reviews for Academic Libraries award. She also earned the University of Delaware CHOICE award. In 2000, Horowitz left the University of Delaware and relocated to Canada. That same year, she published "Gender, Genocide, and Jewish Memory."

In 2002, Horowitz was appointed a full-time associate professor at York University in the Faculty of Liberal Arts & Professional Studies. The following year, she received a $97,086 grant to study gender and the holocaust. From 2006 to 2009, she served as president of the Association for Jewish Studies. In 2005, Horowitz was named Director of the Israel and Golda Koschitzky Centre for Jewish Studies at York University.

Horowitz later collaborated with Julia Creet and Amira Dan to edit H. G. Adler: Life, Literature, Legacy, which won the 2016 Canadian Jewish Literary Award for best contribution to Jewish thought and culture. She also served on the jury for the 2019 Canadian Jewish Literary Awards.

Horowitz currently serves on the Academic Advisory Committee of the United States Holocaust Memorial Museum as sits on the advisory board of the Remember the Women Institute

== Selected publications ==
- Voicing the void: muteness and memory in Holocaust fiction
- Women in Holocaust literature: Engendering trauma memory
- But is it Good for the Jews? Spielberg's Schindler and the Aesthetics of Atrocity
- Gender, Genocide, and Jewish Memory
- Memory and Testimony of Women Survivors of Nazi Genocide
- Engaging survivors: Assessing 'testimony' and 'trauma' as foundational concepts
- The gender of good and evil: Women and Holocaust memory
- Nostalgia and the Holocaust
- Mengele, the Gynecologist, and Other Stories of Women's Survival
- The cinematic triangulation of Jewish American identity: Israel, America and the Holocaust
- Gender and Holocaust representation
