= Jenkovce =

Jenkovce Jenke
- Municipality
- Flag

- Location of Jenkovce in the Košice Region Location of Jenkovce in Slovakia
- Coordinates: 48.65°N 22.22°E
- Country: Slovakia
- Region: Košice Region
- District: Sobrance District
- First mentioned: 1288

Area
  - Total: 14.86 km^{2} (5.74 sq mi)
- Elevation: 107 m (351 ft)

Population (2025)
  - Total: 416
- Time zone: UTC+1 (CET)
  - Summer (DST): UTC+2 (CEST)
- Postal code: 725 2
- Area code: +421 56
- Vehicle registration plate (until 2022): SO
- Website: www.obecjenkovce.sk

Jenkovce (Hungarian: Jenke) is a village and municipality in the Sobrance District in the Košice Region of east Slovakia.

== History ==
In historical records the village was first mentioned in 1288.

== Geography ==
The municipality lies at an altitude of 107 metres (351 ft) and covers an area of 14.86 km^{2} (5.74 sq mi) (2025).

== Population ==
Population statistic (10 years)
Year	1995	2005	2015	2025
Count	402	440	442	416
Difference		+9.45%	+0.45%	−5.88%

Population statistic
Year	2024	2025
Count	407	416
Difference		+2.21%

It has a population of 416 people (31 December 2025).

=== Ethnicity ===
Census 2021 (1+ %)
Ethnicity	Number	Fraction
Slovak	384	90.78%
Not found out	26	6.14%
Ukrainian	11	2.6%
Rusyn	7	1.65%
Total	423	

In year 2021 was 423 people by ethnicity 384 as Slovak, 26 as Not found out, 11 as Ukrainian, 7 as Rusyn, 4 as Czech, 2 as Other, 1 as German and 1 as Hungarian.

Note on population: The difference values of population numbers in the table "Population statistic" and in the sections "Ethnicity" & "Religion" is caused by the use of various statistical methods.

=== Religion ===
Census 2021 (1+ %)
Religion	Number	Fraction
Roman Catholic Church	169	39.95%
Calvinist Church	101	23.88%
Greek Catholic Church	51	12.06%
Not found out	33	7.8%
None	21	4.96%
Eastern Orthodox Church	17	4.02%
Jehovah's Witnesses	15	3.55%
United Methodist Church	8	1.89%
Total	423	

In year 2021 was 423 people by religion 169 from Roman Catholic Church, 101 from Calvinist Church, 51 from Greek Catholic Church, 33 from Not found out, 21 from None, 17 from Eastern Orthodox Church, 15 from Jehovah's Witnesses, 8 from United Methodist Church, 2 from Other and not ascertained christian church, 2 from Evangelical Church, 2 from Church of the Brethren and 2 from Ad hoc movements.

== Culture ==
The village has a public library, and a football pitch

== Genealogical resources ==
The records for genealogical research are available at the state archive "Statny Archiv in Presov, Slovakia"

- Roman Catholic church records (births/marriages/deaths): 1789-1899 (parish A)
- Greek catholic church records (births/marriages/deaths): 1848-1907 (parish B)
- Reformated church records (births/marriages/deaths): 1844-1897 (parish A)

== See also ==
- List of municipalities and towns in Slovakia
