= Sarah Horowitz-Sternfeld =

Polish rabbi

Sarah Horowitz-Sternfeld (1838-1937), of Chęciny, Poland, was a prominent religious personality in the Hasidic community in the pre-World-War II era. Horowitz-Sternfeld was associated with the Chentshin-Ozharov, an amalgamation of the Chentshin and Ozharov dynasties, and was known as the Chentshiner Rebbetzin. According to scholars of Hasidic history, it is clear that Horowitz-Sternfeld was revered by Hasidic Jews of Poland for her spiritual position and she had adopted the custom typically associated of Hasidic leaders (the rebbe or tzaddik) to receive petitions for blessings. The exact degree of her status in the Hasidic is contested, with some authors portraying Horowitz-Sternfeld as a "woman rebbe" (froi rebbe).

In 1937, American Jewish coverage of the death of Sarah Horowitz-Sternfeld was described as the death of "the world's only woman Chassidic rabbi".

Sarah Horowitz-Sternfeld was the daughter of Rabbi Joshua Heschel Frankel-Teonim and wife of Rabbi Chaim Shmuel Horowitz-Sternfeld of Chentshin.

== See also ==
- Faige Teitelbaum
