= Opatów County =

Opatów County Powiat opatowski
- County
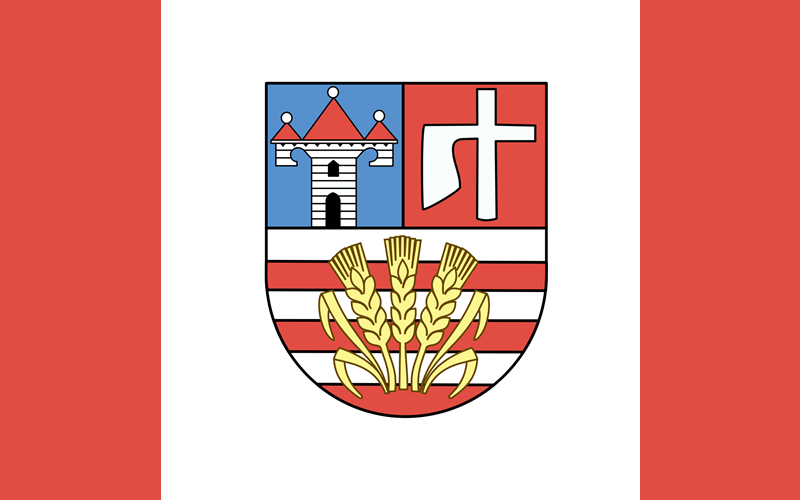
- Flag Coat of arms

- Location within the voivodeship

- Division into gminas
- Coordinates (Opatów): 50°48′18″N 21°25′29″E
- Country: Poland
- Voivodeship: Świętokrzyskie
- Seat: Opatów
- Gminas: Total 8: Gmina Baćkowice; Gmina Iwaniska; Gmina Lipnik; Gmina Opatów; Gmina Ożarów; Gmina Sadowie; Gmina Tarłów; Gmina Wojciechowice

Area
  - Total: 911.51 km^{2} (351.94 sq mi)

Population (2019)
  - Total: 53,942
  - Density: 59.179/km^{2} (153.27/sq mi)
  - Urban: 11,035
  - Rural: 42,907
- Car plates: TOP
- Website: www.opatow.pl

Opatów County (Polish: powiat opatowski) is a unit of territorial administration and local government (powiat) in Świętokrzyskie Voivodeship, south-central Poland. It came into being on January 1, 1999, as a result of the Polish local government reforms passed in 1998. Its administrative seat and largest town is Opatów, which lies 58 kilometres (36 mi) east of the regional capital Kielce. The only other town in the county is Ożarów, lying 20 km (12 mi) north-east of Opatów.

The county covers an area of 911.51 square kilometres (351.9 sq mi). As of 2019 its total population is 53,942, out of which the population of Opatów is 6,466, that of Ożarów is 4,569, and the rural population is 42,907.

== Neighbouring counties ==
Opatów County is bordered by Ostrowiec County and Lipsko County to the north, Opole County to the north-east, Kraśnik County and Sandomierz County to the east, Staszów County to the south-west, and Kielce County to the west.

== Administrative divisions ==
The county is subdivided into eight gminas (two urban-rural and six rural). These are listed in the following table, in descending order of population.

Gmina	Type	Area (km^{2})	Population (2019)	Seat
Gmina Opatów	urban-rural	113.4	11,676	Opatów
Gmina Ożarów	urban-rural	183.3	10,741	Ożarów
Gmina Iwaniska	rural	105.0	6,648	Iwaniska
Gmina Lipnik	rural	81.7	5,231	Lipnik
Gmina Tarłów	rural	163.8	5,171	Tarłów
Gmina Baćkowice	rural	96.3	4,874	Baćkowice
Gmina Wojciechowice	rural	86.4	4,036	Wojciechowice
Gmina Sadowie	rural	81.7	3,959	Sadowie
