= Ożarów =

Town in Świętokrzyskie Voivodeship, Poland

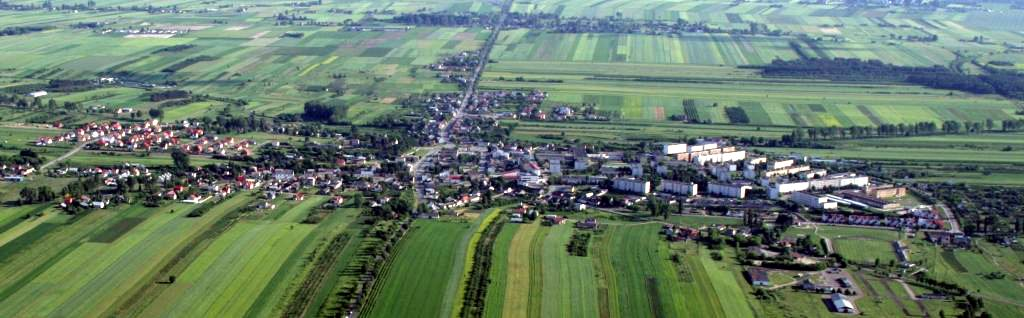
- Bird's-eye view of Ożarów

- Flag Coat of arms

- Location within Poland
- Coordinates: 50°53′27″N 21°40′4″E
- Country: Poland
- Voivodeship: Świętokrzyskie
- County: Opatów
- Gmina: Ożarów

Area
  - Total: 7.79 km^{2} (3.01 sq mi)

Population (2021)
  - Total: 10,399
  - Density: 1,330/km^{2} (3,460/sq mi)
- Postal code: 27-530
- Area code: +48 15
- Car plates: TOP
- Website: http://www.ozarow.pl/

Ożarów (Polish pronunciation: [ɔˈʐaruf]; Yiddish: אָזשאַראָװ, romanized: Ozharov) is a town in Poland, in the province of Świętokrzyskie Voivodeship, in Opatów county (Powiat of Opatów), historic Lesser Poland, with 10,399 inhabitants as of December 31, 2021. Ożarów received its town charter in 1569, during the Polish Golden Age, lost it in 1869, and regained in 1988. The town lies in eastern part of the province, some fifteen kilometers west of the Vistula river. Ożarów's coat of arms is the Rawa, which was used by the Ozarowski family.

Ożarów is a road hub, where National Road Nr. 79 (Warsaw - Bytom) meets Local Road Nr. 755. The town has a sports club Alit, established in 1947.

== History ==
Ożarów was founded in 1569 by Józef Ożarowski on the grounds of Wyszmontów village. It received city rights from King Zygmunt August, and until the Partitions of Poland was part of Sandomierz Voivodeship. In 1815 - 1915, the town belonged to Russian-controlled Congress Poland. In 1767, a fire destroyed the centre of the city, which was rebuilt in a slightly different place. The first original city centre was located along present day Kolejowa Street. By 1787 the steadily growing Jewish population reached 1,000. In 1869, following the failed January Uprising, Ożarów – like many similar Polish cities – was stripped of its city rights as punishment for supporting the independence movement.

During the Revolution of 1905, Ożarów was part of the so-called Ostrowiec Republic (Republika Ostrowiecka), anti-Russian revolutionary movement, led by the Polish Socialist Party. In 1915, the village was visited by Józef Piłsudski, and in late May of that year, a skirmish between Polish Legions in World War I and the Russian Imperial Army took place here. The Russians burned Ożarów to the ground; the village was rebuilt in 1916 - 1920.

Its largest employer is a nearby cement plant. The cement factory was privatized in 1995 and, a controlling stake in the company was purchased from HCP (Holding Cement Polski) by Irish company CRH plc. Recently, one of the agents involved in brokering the transaction between HCP and CRH claimed to have paid a USD 1m bribe to make the acquisition. The results of that inquiry were still pending as of June 2005. CRH plc owns more than a dozen operations in Poland.

== The Holocaust ==
During occupation of Poland in World War II, the Nazi Germans created a Jewish ghetto in Ożarów for the imprisonment not only of the local Jews but also deportation transports from Radom, Włocławek and even Vienna. The ghetto held around 4,500 inmates between January and October 1942, at which time all inhabitants were loaded onto Holocaust trains, shipped to Treblinka extermination camp and murdered upon arrival. Ożarów lost 64% of its citizens in the Holocaust.

The post-World War II development of Ożarów is connected with construction of a cement plant. It was initiated in 1972, and as a result, new block of flats were built for the workers of the plant. The population quickly grew in the late 1970s and early 1980s, and on December 18, 1987, the government of the People's Republic of Poland agreed to grant town charter to the village.

=== Jewish history of Ożarów ===
Rabbi Yehudah Leib Epstein became Rabbi of Ożarów (see Ozharov (Hasidic dynasty)) in Poland in 1811. He was a disciple of the Seer of Lublin, the Holy Jew of Prshiskhe, the Ohev Yisrael of Apt, and Rabbi Myer, the Or LaShamayim of Apt. His followers numbered in the thousands.

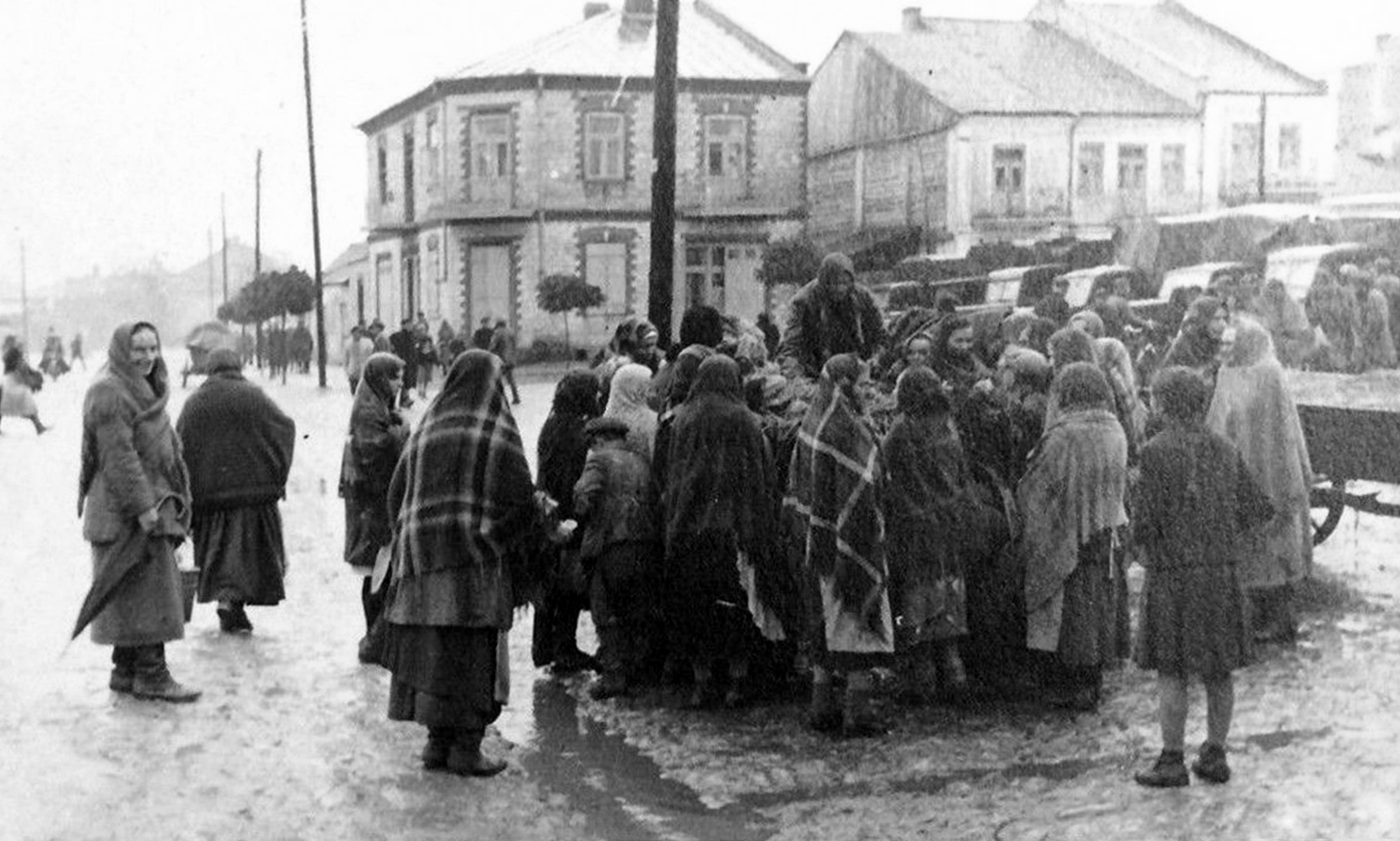
Main market in Ozarow, September 1939

He was succeeded by his son, Rabbi Yechiel Chaim Epstein, who was in turn succeeded by his son Rabbi Arye Yehuda Leib Epstein, author of the Hasidic work Birkas Tov. Rabbi Arye Yehuda Leib had six children including Grand Rabbi Avraham Shlomo Epstein of Ozharov (1864-1917) who succeeded his father in 1913.

Rabbi Moshe Yechiel Epstein first came to the U.S. in 1920 and eventually moved there permanently in 1926 after being offered to be the rabbi of a synagogue for Ożarów immigrants on the Lower East Side of Manhattan. Rabbi Moshe Yechiel's entire family in Europe was wiped out in the Holocaust. Rabbi Moshe Yechiel moved to Tel Aviv in 1952, where he spent the rest of his life.

Rabbi Moshe Yechiel was known as one of the great Torah scholars of his generation, authoring Eish Dos (11 volumes) and Be'er Moshe (12 volumes). In 1968 he was a recipient of the Israel Prize in the category of Torah literature. Rabbi Moshe Yechiel died in 1971.

== Points of interest ==
- Parish Church of Bishop St. Stanisław from late 19th century; erected near a bell tower dating back to 18th century; and, the chapel at Mickiewicza Street, built in gratitude for saving Ożarów from the plague.
- Jewish cemetery in town dating back almost 400 years, one of the few historic Jewish cemeteries in Poland preserved in their original form. The cemetery wall however, was almost totally destroyed during World War II by general warfare as well as German soldiers using the stones for fortifications. In May 2001, Norman Weinberg organized the Ożarów Cemetery Restoration Project aimed at renovating and rebuilding the cemetery, which was completed in October 2001.
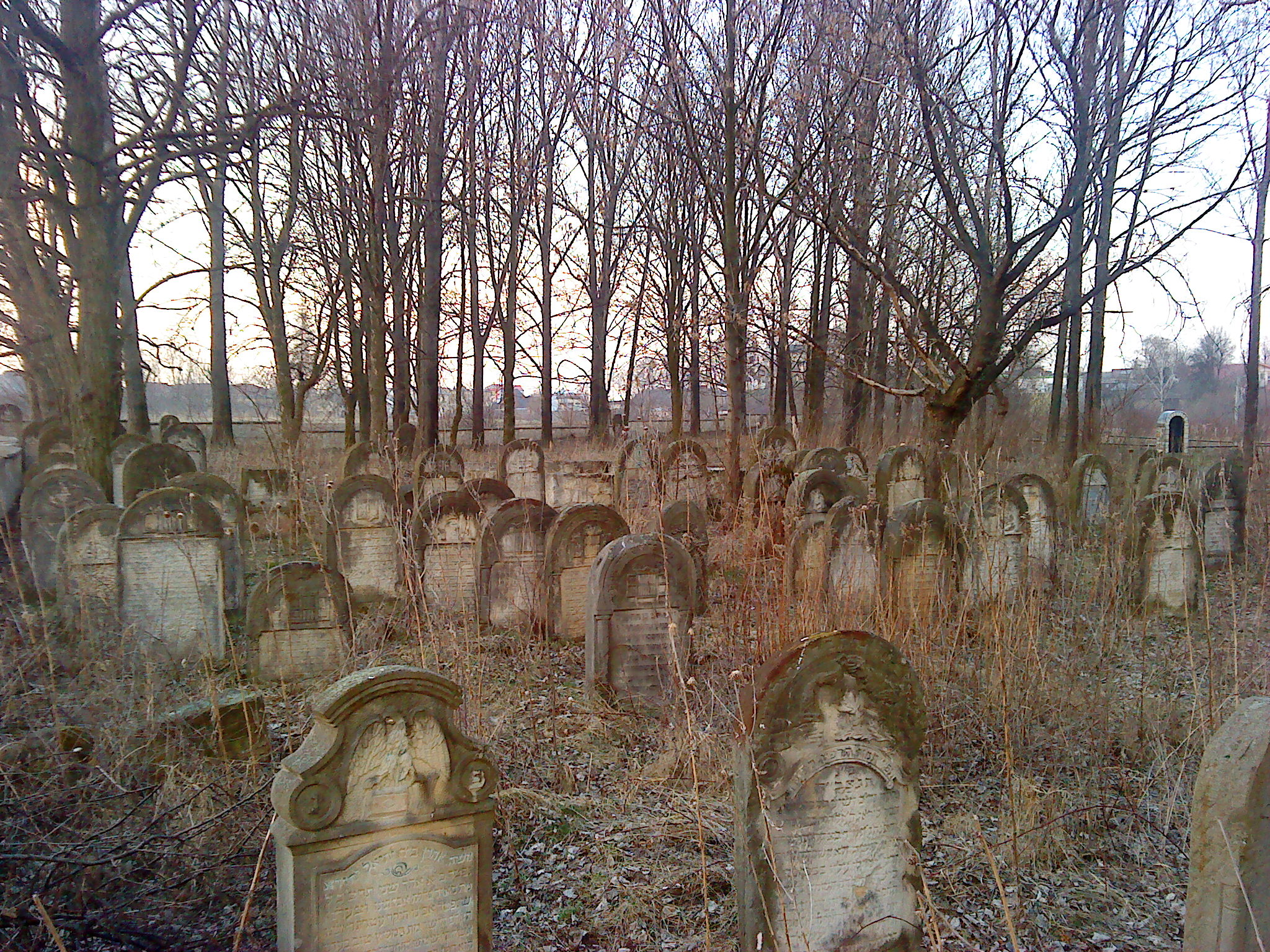
Historic Jewish Cemetery in Ożarów

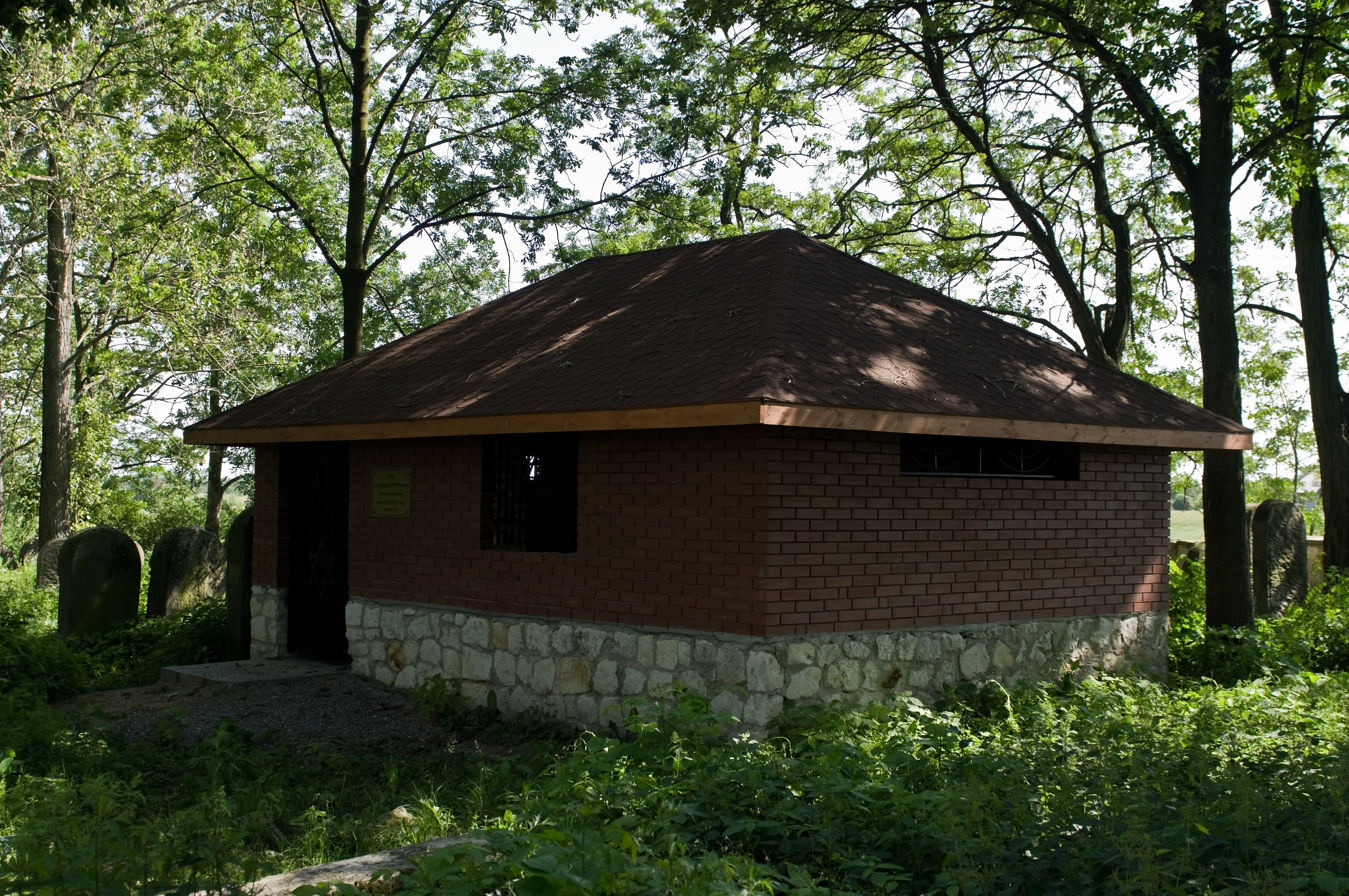
Ohel for meditation at the Jewish Cemetery

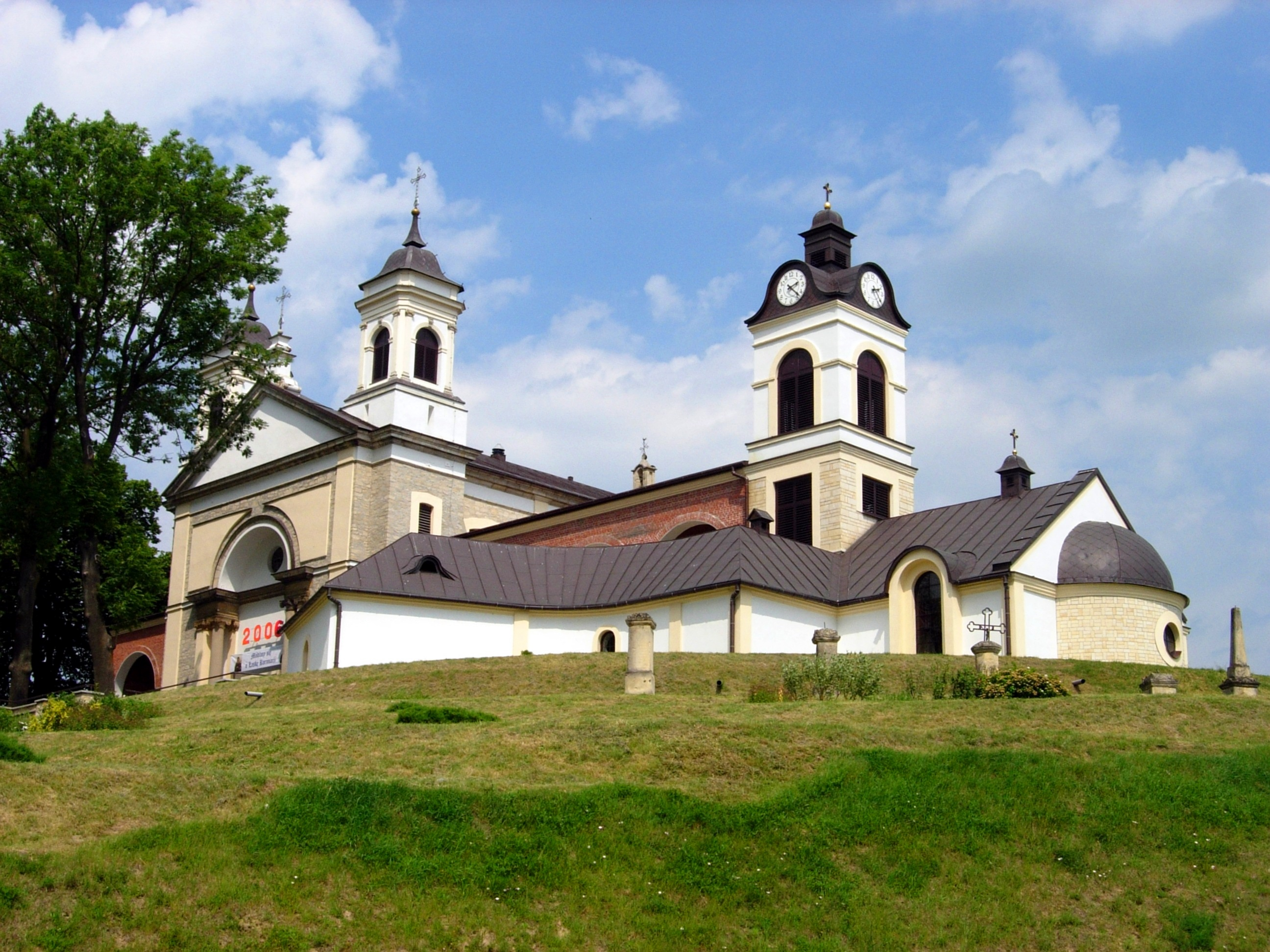
Church of St. Stanisław
