= Opatów =

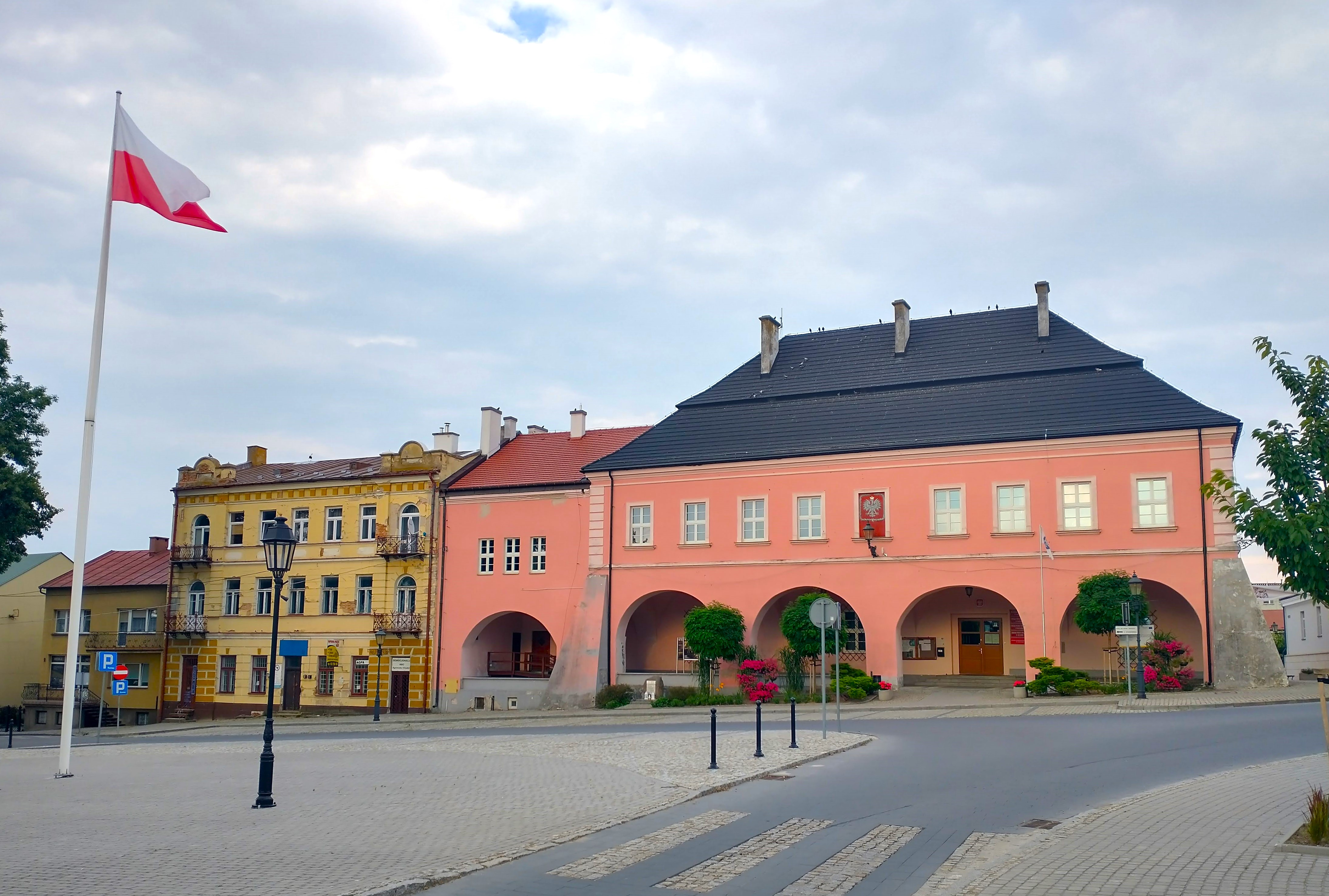
- Rynek (Market Square) in Opatów with the Town Hall

- Coat of arms

- Location within Poland
- Coordinates: 50°48′18″N 21°25′29″E
- Country: Poland
- Voivodeship: Świętokrzyskie
- County: Opatów
- Gmina: Gmina Opatów
- Founded: 10th–11th century
- First mentioned: 1189
- Town rights: 1282

Area
  - Total: 9.36 km^{2} (3.61 sq mi)

Population (2012)
  - Total: 6,658
  - Density: 711/km^{2} (1,840/sq mi)
- Time zone: UTC+1 (CET)
  - Summer (DST): UTC+2 (CEST)
- Postal code: 27-500
- Area code: +48 15
- Car plates: TOP
- Website: http://www.umopatow.pl/

Opatów ([ɔˈpatuf]; Yiddish: אַפּטאַ, אַפּט, romanized: Apt, Apte) is a town in southeastern Poland, within Opatów County in the Świętokrzyskie Voivodeship. Historically, it was part of a greater region called Lesser Poland. In 2012 the population was 6,658. Opatów is located among the hills of Lesser Polish Upland, with the Opatówka river dividing the town into two parts.

A town with a history of some 1,000 years, Opatów is one of the province's best-preserved historic towns and once one of the largest cities in its territory, owing its prosperity to crafts and trade. Its landmarks include the Collegiate Church of St. Martin, listed as a Historic Monument of Poland as one of the most precious examples of Romanesque architecture in Poland, the Baroque Bernardine monastery, town hall and underground tourist routes in late medieval cellars under the old town. Opatów is home to local specialties such as pączki, krówki and kiełbasa.

== History ==
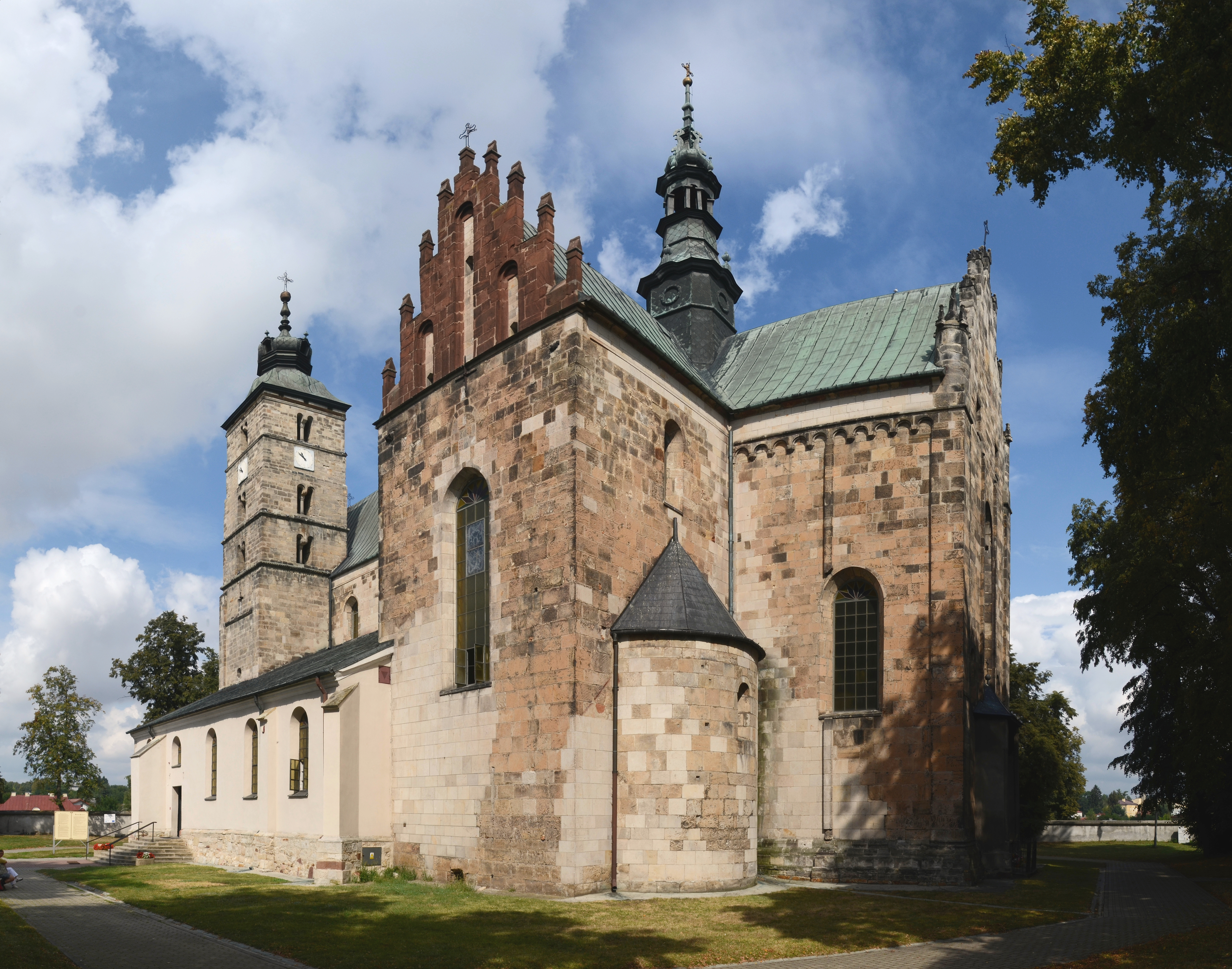
St. Martin's Collegiate Church, Opatów, a Romanesque church from the second half of the 12th century

In the Middle Ages, Opatów was a settlement on the Opatówka River, in an area of forests and lakes. It was founded as a stronghold of the early Polish state in the late 10th or early 11th century. First mentioned in 1189, it was the residence of the regional ruler (Castellan) and one of the largest settlements of the Sandomierz Land. First church was built here sometime in the 11th century. In the 12th century, St. Martin collegiate church was built as well. The purpose of the collegiate church is not known, it was probably designed for a Roman Catholic diocese which was created in Sandomierz instead.

In 1232, Polish Duke Henry the Bearded transferred Opatów to Lawrence, Bishop of Lubusz. In 1237, it was granted privileges that regularized the status of its residents and in 1282 it received the status of a city with wide privileges. In the first half of the 14th century, Bishop of Lubusz Stefan II decided to move the center of the town to the hill near the collegiate church. New town was called Great Opatów (Opatów Wielki), also Magnum Oppathow and Magna Opatow.

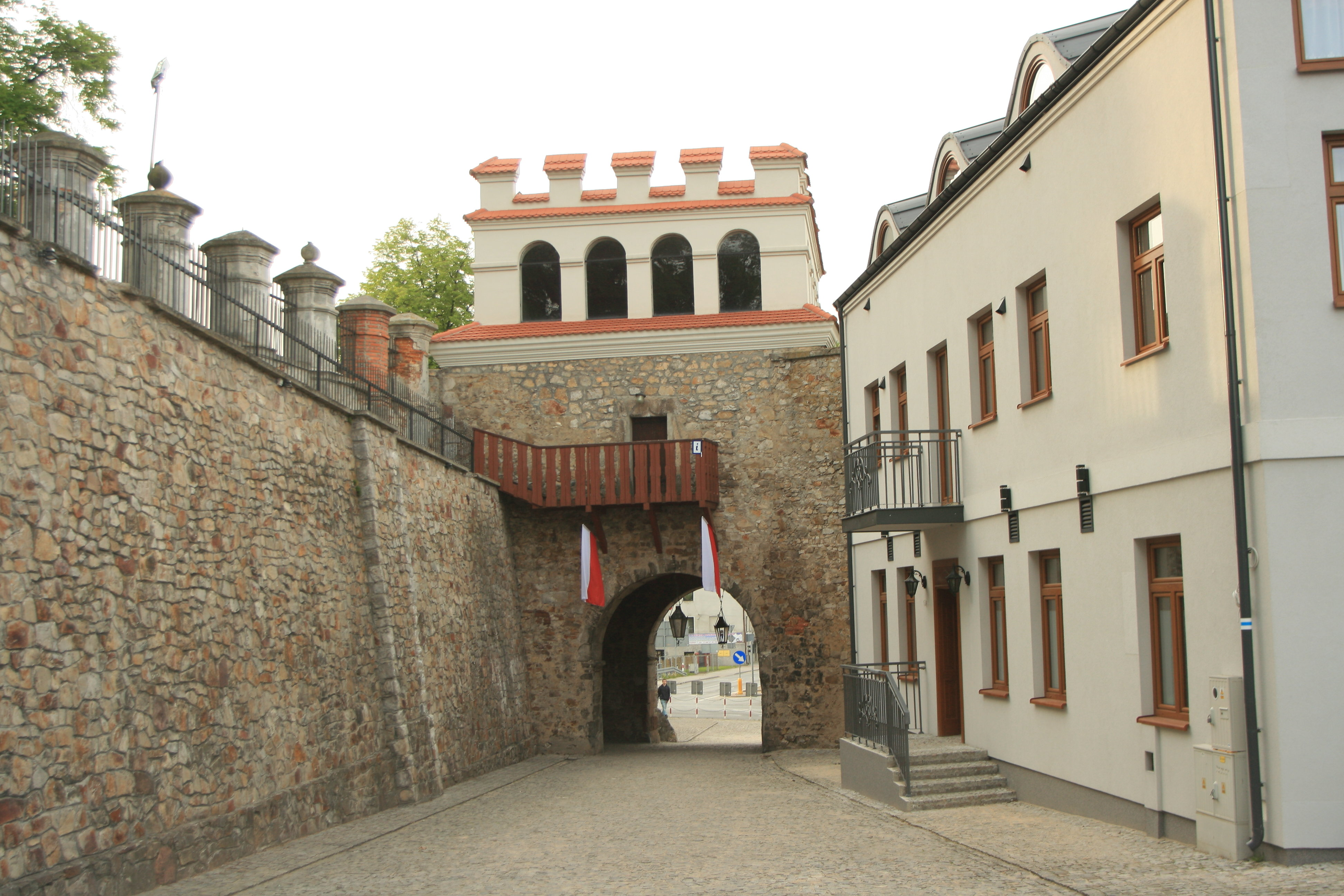
Warsaw Gate and remains of a defensive wall

For centuries, until the Partitions of Poland, Opatów was an important regional center of Lesser Poland. During an invasion of the Tartars (1502), the town was destroyed. In 1514, it was transferred to Krzysztof Szydłowiecki, who restored it, surrounded with a defensive wall, built a castle and offices for the local government, and improved the water supply to the residents. Opatów had two annual fairs and two market days a week. It was a private town, administratively located in the Sandomierz County in the Sandomierz Voivodeship in the Lesser Poland Province of the Kingdom of Poland.

In the 16th century, Opatów had a population of roughly 4,000 and was the biggest town of the province, even more populous than Sandomierz. The town was a center of political life of the Voivodeship; here General Sejmiks of the Lesser Poland nobility took place. In 1551 Opatów burned almost completely. The great fire marked a slow decline of the town. In 1655, Opatów was destroyed in the Swedish Deluge. The town also suffered during other conflicts including the Great Northern War, the Bar Confederation, the Polish–Russian War of 1792, and the Kościuszko Uprising. It belonged to a number of noble families (Tarnowski family, Ostrogski family, Lubomirski family, Potocki family, and Karski family), and remained in private hands until 1864.

In the 18th century, Opatów became home to a number of Greeks, who had escaped to Poland from the Turkish occupation of their homeland (see Ottoman Greece). They were allowed to open Greek Orthodox churches. In 1778, an Orthodox parish of St Nicholas was opened, which in 1837 was moved to Radom.

=== Late modern period ===
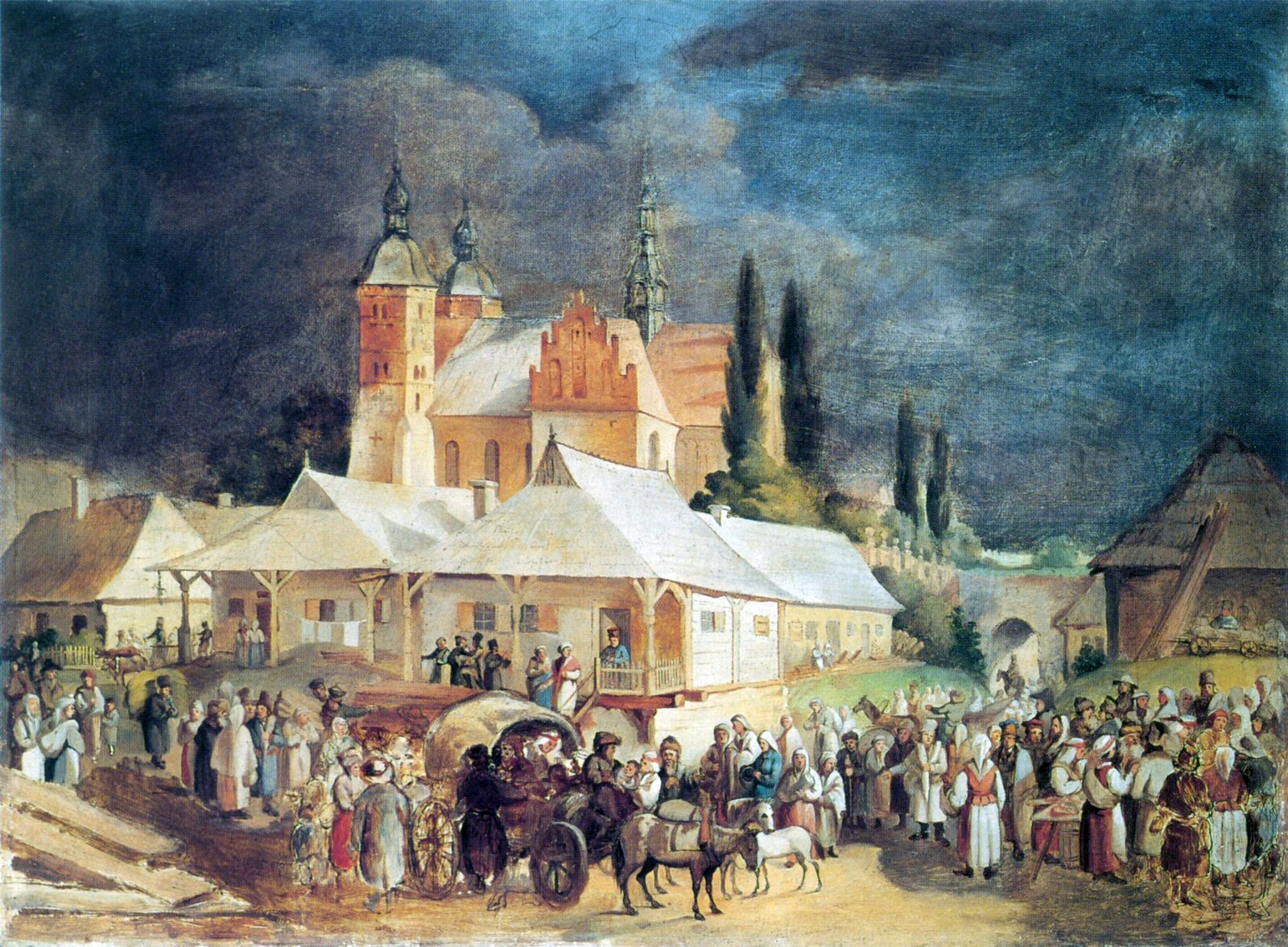
Market in Opatów, 19th-century painting by Jan Feliks Piwarski

The town was annexed by Austria in the Third Partition of Poland in 1795. In this time, the town had about 413 houses and more than 3,000 inhabitants. More than 40% of houses were inhabited by Jews. After the Polish victory in the Austro-Polish War of 1809, it was included within the short-lived Duchy of Warsaw, and after the duchy's dissolution in 1815, it fell to the Russian Partition of Poland. During the January Uprising, two battles took place in Opatów between Russians and II Corps of General Józef Hauke-Bosak. Poles captured the town on November 25, 1863, and withdrew with seized Russian guns and ammunition. On February 21, 1864, the second battle took place. It was one of the largest skirmishes of the uprising, and it ended in Polish defeat. Polish commander Ludwik Zwierzdowski was executed by the Russians at the market square on February 23, 1864. Poland eventually regained independence in 1918, after World War I. In 1924 a monument to Ludwik Zwierzdowski was erected at the market square.

=== World War II ===
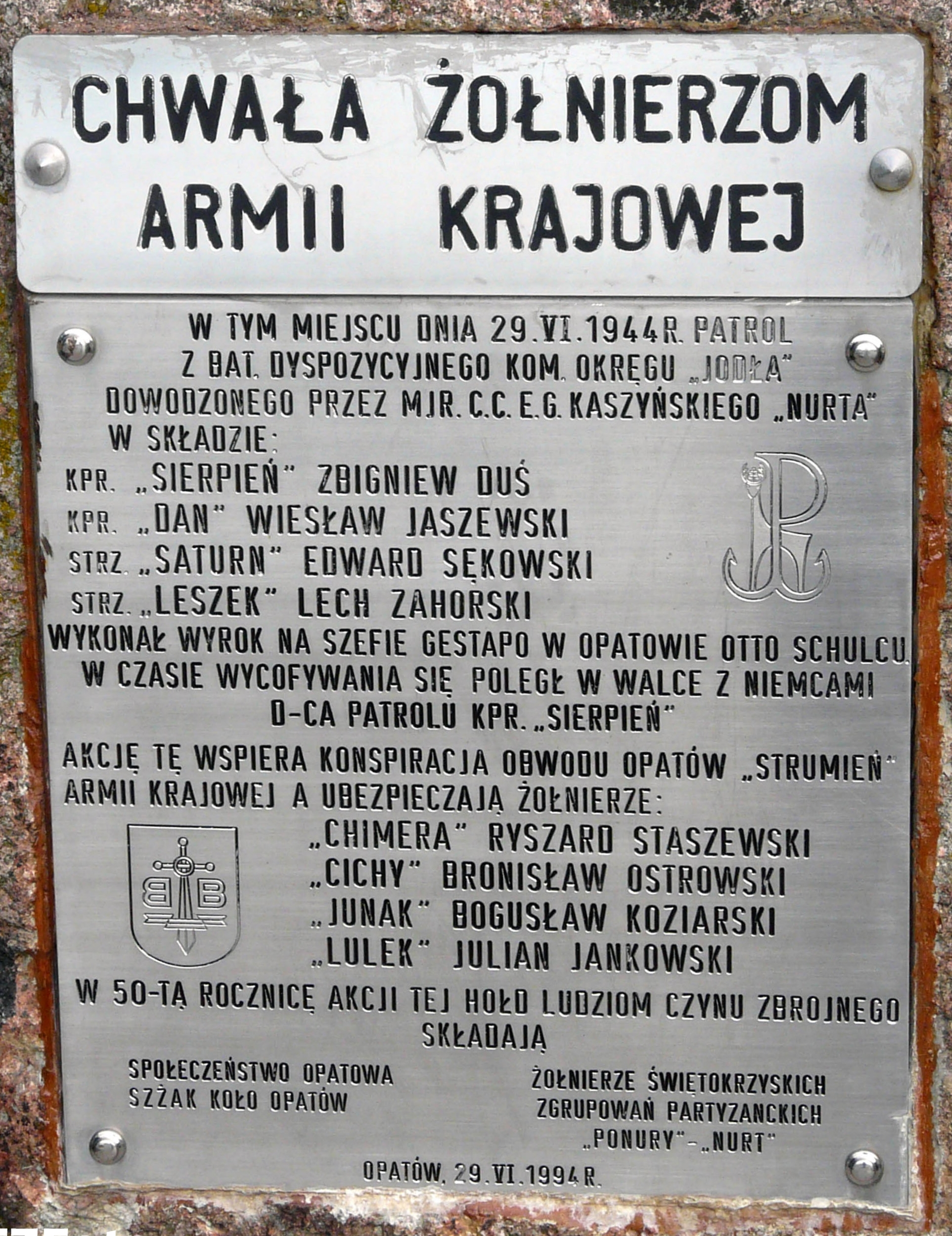
Memorial plaque at the site of the assassination of the Gestapo chief by the Home Army in 1944

During the joint German–Soviet invasion of Poland, which started World War II, in September 1939, Opatów was invaded and afterwards occupied by Germany. In 1939, the Germans ordered the demolition of the Ludwik Zwierzdowski monument, so the local mayor buried it to preserve it, thanks to which it was restored after the war. In 1940 the Germans carried out mass arrests of Poles as part of the AB-Aktion. Poles arrested in March were either deported to Nazi concentration camps or massacred in Góry Wysokie, while those arrested in June were imprisoned and tortured in Skarżysko-Kamienna and then murdered. Opatów was a large center of the Polish underground resistance movement. Polish underground press printed in nearby Sandomierz was distributed in Opatów since 1940, and from November 1943 a secret Polish printing house was also launched in Opatów. On March 11, 1943, the Germans carried out mass arrests of local Poles, including resistance members. On the night of March 12–13, 1943, a Polish underground partisan unit Jędrusie, together with soldiers of the Home Army, carried out a successful attack on the local German prison and liberated 80 prisoners, before the Germans would deport them elsewhere. In June 1944, the Home Army assassinated the local Gestapo chief Otto Schultz.

== Jewish community of Opatów ==
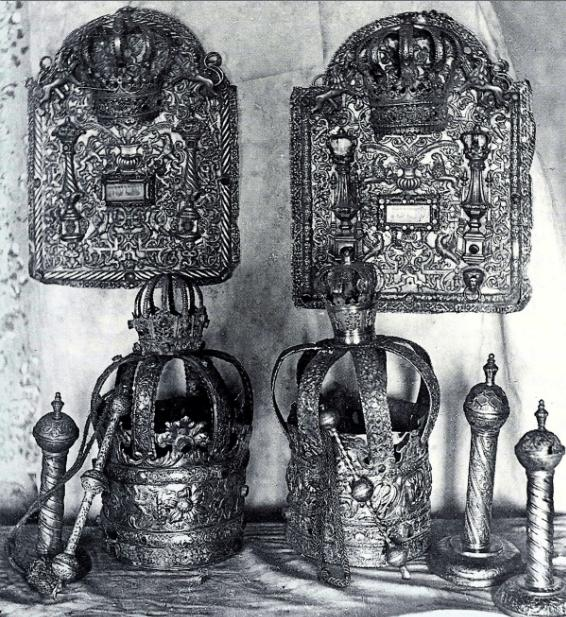
Silver Tora Crowns and Jewish ceremonial objects from Opatów Synagogue lost in the Holocaust

Opatów was the first town in the Sandomierz Voivodeship, in which Jews settled. The original Jewish privileges were issued in 1545 by the Grand Crown Hetman Jan Tarnowski, the starost of Sandomierz and the owner of Opatów. Local Jewish community was first mentioned in the books of the Roman Catholic ecclesiastical Chapter in 1612.

Prior to World War II, Opatów had a substantial Jewish population. Known as 'Apt' in Yiddish, Opatów became home to 6,000 Jews with a history of rich cultural and religious life. Best known from among the locals was the 18th century Rabbi Avraham Yehoshua Heshel (Apter Rebbe), who was instrumental in the development of the Chasidic movement, and the famous Noda Be'Yehuda of Prague, one of the leading halakhic authorities of 18th Century Europe. Jewish life in Opatów has been chronicled by Professor Gershon Hundert in his 1992 book The Jews in a Private Polish Town, drawing upon a variety of sources from the history of Jews in Poland. The work describes the demographic and historical background as well as the structure of the Jewish community of Opatów with a population numbering about 2,000 in 1765, exceptionally large for any Jewish shtetl in the 18th century Europe. The town's Jewish inhabitants enjoyed considerable prominence also in the following centuries. Hundert uses the Jewish Opatów as a case study for Polish Jewry. More than three-quarters of them lived on private lands of powerful magnate aristocrats known as the Szlachta. Hundert's work also describes the vibrant interaction of the Jews of Opatów with their Polish Christian neighbours. It is a challenge to previous historiography which describes Jewish life in Poland in alleged isolation.

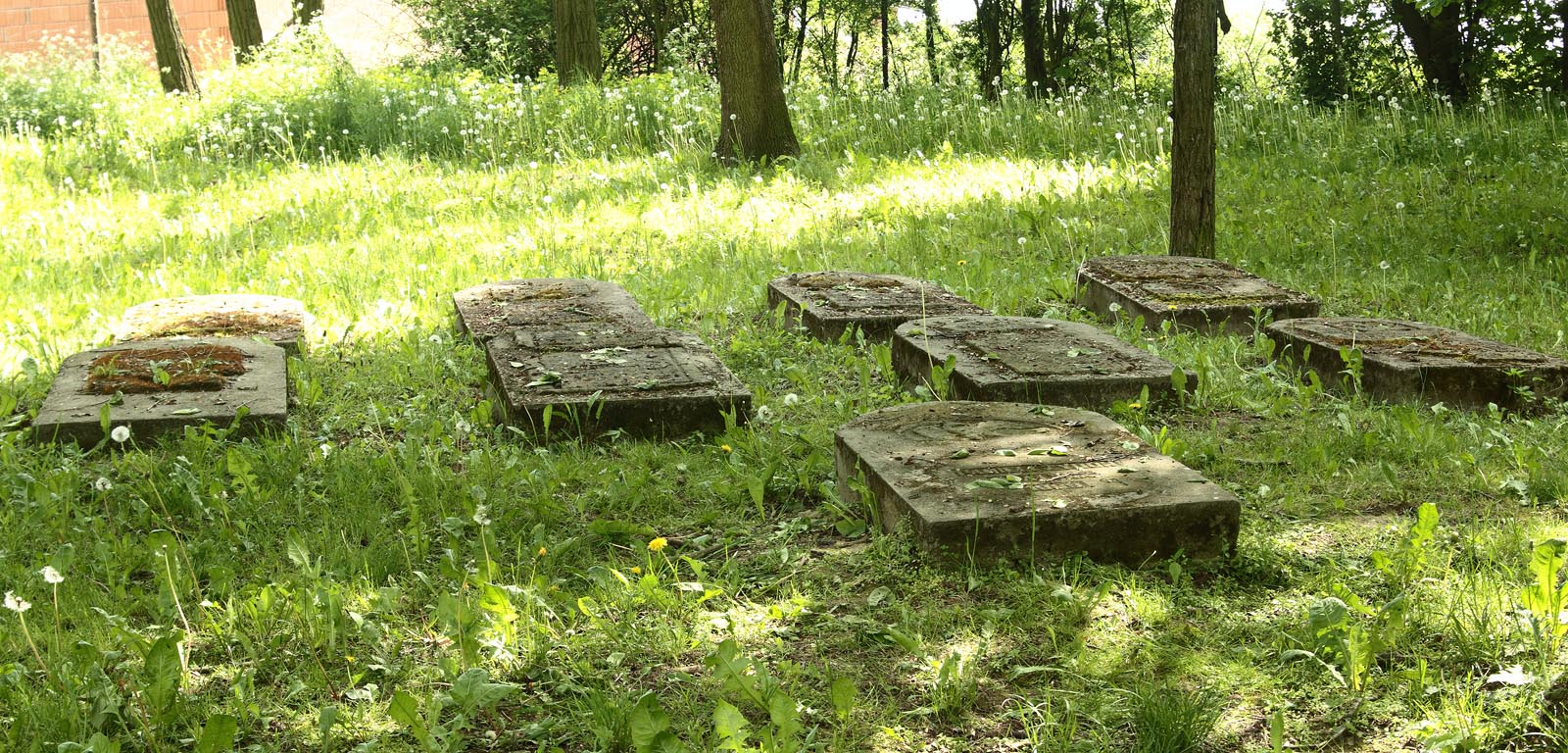
Remnants of Jewish cemetery

During World War II the community was herded into the new Opatów Ghetto set up by Nazi Germany along the Joselewicza, Zatylna, Wąska and Starowałowa Streets. The ghetto held about ten thousand Jews. It was destroyed during the Holocaust in Poland, with about 8,000 Ghetto inmates deported to Treblinka extermination camp throughout October 1942 and additional 2,000 Jews sent to labour camps never to return. Only about 300 of Opatów's pre-war Jewish population of around 5000 survived.

== Economy ==
After the war, the city developed textiles and food manufacturing industries. The new housing estate and a Cultural Centre were built. Currently, the city sees its opportunities in the further development of tourism. However, there is no train station in Opatów – the nearest station is in Ostrowiec, 17 kilometres (11 mi) distance. Communication network consists of a city bus and private bus companies. The key focus areas of municipal government are the development of technical infrastructure, tourism, small business, attracting investors, and the promotion of education as well as the city itself. Traditional occupations and sources of income include agricultural farms, crafts, services and trade.

== Cuisine ==
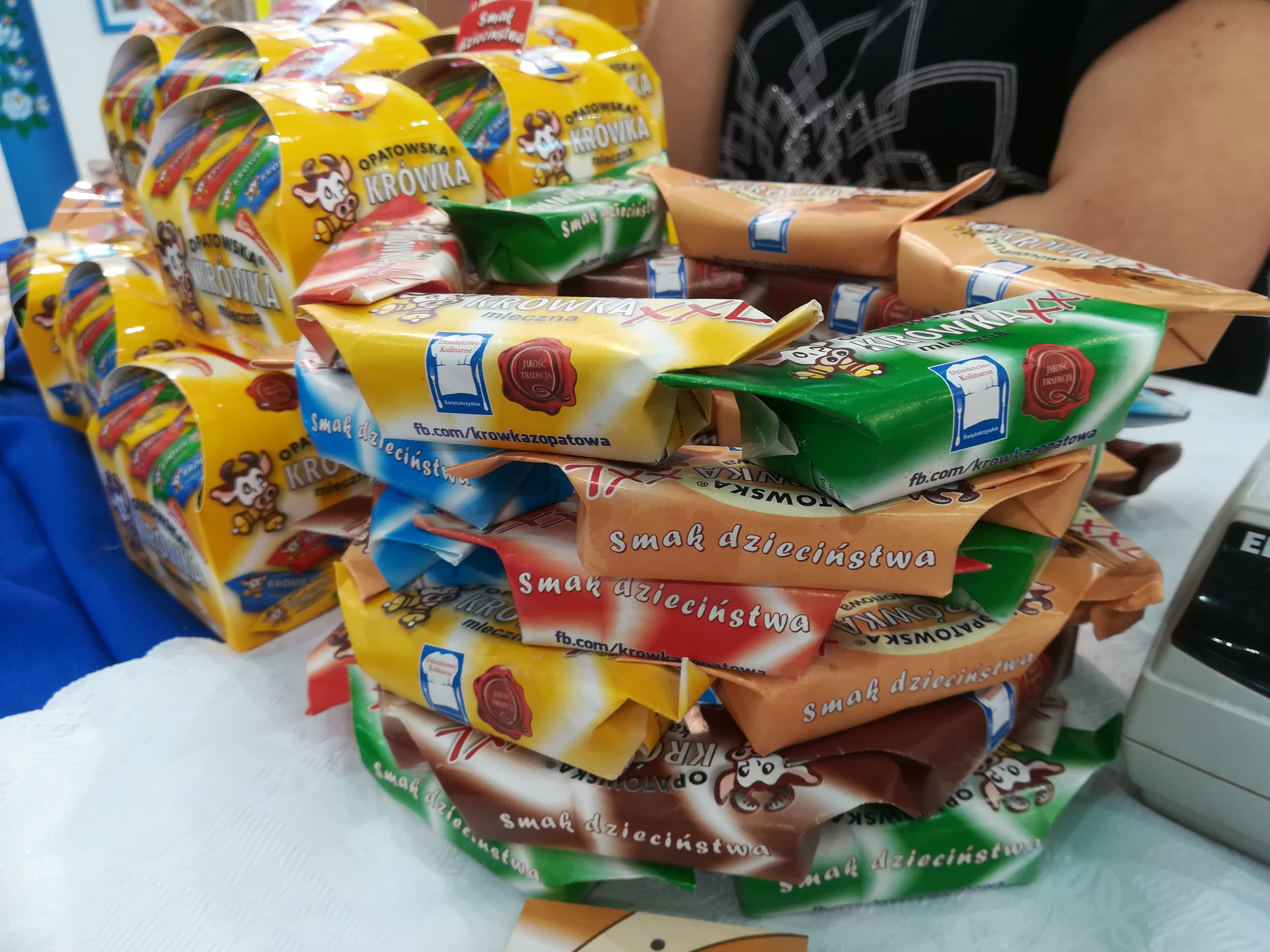
Krówki from Opatów

The officially protected traditional foods of Opatów (as designated by the Ministry of Agriculture and Rural Development of Poland) include kiełbasa swojska opatowska, a local type of kiełbasa sausage, pączek opatowski, a local type of pączek doughnut, and krówka opatowska, a local type of krówka toffee candy.

== Sports ==
The local football club is OKS Opatów. It competes in the lower leagues.

== Twin towns ==
Opatów is twinned with:

- Modrý Kameň, Slovakia

== People ==
- Witold Gombrowicz, born in nearby village of Maloszyce.
- Włodzimierz Mazur, football player
- Tomasz Żelazowski, football player
- Avraham Yehoshua Heshel of Apt (Apter Rebbe, Apter Rov), lived here
- Itche Goldberg, Yiddish writer and scholar of Yiddish culture.
- Yisroel Hopsztajn (Hapstein)
- Mayer Kirshenblatt, painter
- Yechezkel Landau, rabbi of Prague
- Peter Litvin, musician, a descendant of Ruhlzalski Family of Opatow
