= Kamenec =

Kamenec may refer to:

== Places ==
=== Czech Republic ===
- Kamenec (Rokycany District), a municipality and village in the Plzeň Region
- Kamenec, a village and part of Jílové in the Ústí nad Labem Region
- Kamenec, a village and part of Stráž nad Ohří in the Karlovy Vary Region
- Kamenec u Poličky, a municipality and village in the Pardubice Region

=== Slovakia ===
- Kamenec pod Vtáčnikom, a municipality and village in the Trenčín Region
- Malý Kamenec, a municipality and village in the Košice Region
- Veľký Kamenec, a municipality and village in the Košice Region

=== Other ===
- Kamyenyets, known in Czech as Kamenec, a town in Belarus
- Szombathely, historically known in Czech and Slovak as Kamenec, a city in Hungary

== People ==
- Ivan Kamenec (born 1931), Slovak historian

== See also ==
- Kamenac, a settlement in Croatia
- Kamenets (disambiguation)
- Kamieniec (disambiguation)
