= Borkowski =

Borkowski (Polish pronunciation: [bɔrˈkɔfski]; feminine: Borkowska; plural: Borkowscy) or Borkowsky is a surname of Polish-language origin. It is a toponymic surname originated for a person associated with any of the places named Borków, Borki, Borkowice, or Borek . Russian equivalent: Borkovsky, Lithuanian: Barkauskas.

The surname may refer to:

- Alfons Dunin-Borkowski (1870–1938), Polish painter
- Amy Borkowsky, American author and comedian
- Anna Borkowska (disambiguation), multiple people
- Ansley B. Borkowski (1898–1992), New York politician
- Bartosz Borkowski (born 2006), Polish footballer
- Bob Borkowski (1926–2017), American baseball player
- Dave Borkowski (born 1977), American baseball player
- Dennis Borkowski (born 2002), German footballer
- Francis Borkowski (1936–2025), American academic, chancellor, and university president
- Franciszek Borkowski (born 1957), Polish chess master
- Frank Borkowski, German judoka
- Ingo Borkowski (born 1971), German sailor
- Mark Borkowski (born 1958), British public relations agent and writer
- Mateusz Borkowski (born 1997), Polish athlete
- Mike Borkowski (born 1973), American racing driver
- Przemysław Borkowski (born 1973), Polish writer and comedian
- Rainer Borkowsky (born 1942), German rower
- Rafal E. Dunin-Borkowski (born 1969), British physicist
- Shek Borkowski (born 1963), Polish football manager
- Tomasz Borkowski (born 1972), Polish football manager

== Fictional characters ==
- Victor Borkowski, a character from X-Men
