= Wojnowice, Opatów County =

Wojnowice
- Village
- Location within Poland
- Coordinates: 50°44′53″N 21°17′11″E
- Country: Poland
- Voivodeship: Świętokrzyskie
- County: Opatów
- Gmina: Iwaniska
- Population: 240

Wojnowice [vɔi̯nɔˈvit͡sɛ] is a village in the administrative district of Gmina Iwaniska, within Opatów County, Świętokrzyskie Voivodeship, in south-central Poland. It lies approximately 2 km (1 mi) north-east of Iwaniska, 12 km (7 mi) south-west of Opatów, and 50 km (31 mi) east of the regional capital Kielce.
