= Radwan, Świętokrzyskie Voivodeship =

Radwan
- Village
- Location within Poland
- Coordinates: 50°41′43″N 21°18′15″E
- Country: Poland
- Voivodeship: Świętokrzyskie
- County: Opatów
- Gmina: Iwaniska
- Population: 250

Radwan [ˈradvan] is a village in the administrative district of Gmina Iwaniska, within Opatów County, Świętokrzyskie Voivodeship, in south-central Poland. It lies approximately 5 km (3 mi) south-east of Iwaniska, 15 km (9 mi) south-west of Opatów, and 53 km (33 mi) south-east of the regional capital Kielce.
