= Postronna =

- Village
- Location within Poland
- Coordinates: 50°37′55″N 21°31′6″E
- Country: Poland
- Voivodeship: Świętokrzyskie
- County: Sandomierz
- Gmina: Koprzywnica
- Population: 283

Postronna [pɔsˈtrɔnna] is a village in the administrative district of Gmina Koprzywnica, within Sandomierz County, Świętokrzyskie Voivodeship, in south-central Poland. It lies approximately 7 km (4 mi) north-west of Koprzywnica, 18 km (11 mi) west of Sandomierz, and 70 km (43 mi) south-east of the regional capital Kielce.
