= Błonie, Świętokrzyskie Voivodeship =

Błonie
- Village
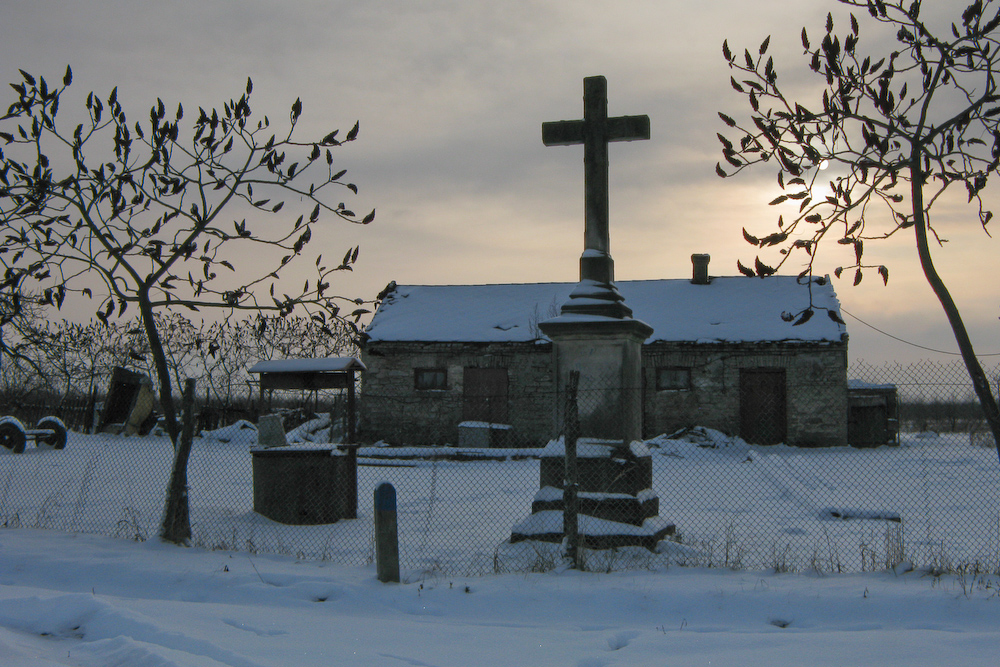

- Location within Poland
- Coordinates: 50°35′N 21°37′E
- Country: Poland
- Voivodeship: Świętokrzyskie
- County: Sandomierz
- Gmina: Koprzywnica
- Population: 346

Błonie [ˈbwɔɲɛ] is a village in the administrative district of Gmina Koprzywnica, within Sandomierz County, Świętokrzyskie Voivodeship, in south-central Poland. It lies approximately 3 km (2 mi) east of Koprzywnica, 15 km (9 mi) south-west of Sandomierz, and 78 km (48 mi) south-east of the regional capital Kielce.
