= Kujawy, Świętokrzyskie Voivodeship =

Kujawy
- Village
- Location within Poland
- Coordinates: 50°41′39″N 21°19′56″E
- Country: Poland
- Voivodeship: Świętokrzyskie
- County: Opatów
- Gmina: Iwaniska
- Population: 370

Kujawy [kuˈjavɨ] is a village in the administrative district of Gmina Iwaniska, within Opatów County, Świętokrzyskie Voivodeship, in south-central Poland. It lies approximately 6 km (4 mi) south-east of Iwaniska, 14 km (9 mi) south-west of Opatów, and 55 km (34 mi) south-east of the regional capital Kielce.
