= Sobiekurów =

- Village
- Location within Poland
- Coordinates: 50°44′39″N 21°18′23″E
- Country: Poland
- Voivodeship: Świętokrzyskie
- County: Opatów
- Gmina: Iwaniska

Sobiekurów [sɔbjɛˈkuruf] is a village in the administrative district of Gmina Iwaniska, within Opatów County, Świętokrzyskie Voivodeship, in south-central Poland. It lies approximately 3 km (2 mi) north-east of Iwaniska, 11 km (7 mi) south-west of Opatów, and 51 km (32 mi) east of the regional capital Kielce.
