= Kamienna Góra, Opatów County =

Kamienna Góra
- Village
- Location within Poland
- Coordinates: 50°42′58″N 21°15′38″E
- Country: Poland
- Voivodeship: Świętokrzyskie
- County: Opatów
- Gmina: Iwaniska

Kamienna Góra [kaˈmjɛnna ˈɡura] is a village in the administrative district of Gmina Iwaniska, within Opatów County, Świętokrzyskie Voivodeship, in south-central Poland. It lies approximately 3 km (2 mi) south-west of Iwaniska, 16 km (10 mi) south-west of Opatów, and 49 km (30 mi) east of the regional capital Kielce.
