= Kopiec =

Kopiec may refer to:

- Kopiec, Gmina Żelechlinek, Tomaszów County in Łódź Voivodeship (central Poland)
- Kopiec, Wieluń County in Łódź Voivodeship (central Poland)
- Kopiec, Lublin Voivodeship (east Poland)
- Kopiec, Masovian Voivodeship (east-central Poland)
- Kopiec, Podlaskie Voivodeship (north-east Poland)
- Kopiec, Silesian Voivodeship (south Poland)
- Kopiec, Świętokrzyskie Voivodeship (south-central Poland)
