= Garbowice =

- Village
- Location within Poland
- Coordinates: 50°42′8″N 21°24′2″E
- Country: Poland
- Voivodeship: Świętokrzyskie
- County: Opatów
- Gmina: Iwaniska
- Population: 160

Garbowice [ɡarbɔˈvit͡sɛ] is a village in the administrative district of Gmina Iwaniska, within Opatów County, Świętokrzyskie Voivodeship, in south-central Poland. It lies approximately 10 km (6 mi) east of Iwaniska, 12 km (7 mi) south of Opatów, and 59 km (37 mi) east of the regional capital Kielce.
