= Barkauskas =

- Lithuanian surname
- m.: Barkauskas
- f.: (unmarried): Barkauskaitė
- f.: (married): Barkauskienė
- Related names: Barkowski, Barkovsky Borkowski, Borkovsky

Barkauskas is a Lithuanian surname. Notable people with the surname include:

- Ignas Barkauskas (born 1988), diver
- Vytautas Barkauskas (1931–2020), composer
