= Ciszyca, Świętokrzyskie Voivodeship =

Ciszyca
- Village
- Location within Poland
- Coordinates: 50°35′3″N 21°38′31″E
- Country: Poland
- Voivodeship: Świętokrzyskie
- County: Sandomierz
- Gmina: Koprzywnica
- Population: 343

Ciszyca [t͡ɕiˈʂɨt͡sa] is a village in the administrative district of Gmina Koprzywnica, within Sandomierz County, Świętokrzyskie Voivodeship, in south-central Poland. It lies approximately 5 km (3 mi) east of Koprzywnica, 14 km (9 mi) south-west of Sandomierz, and 80 km (50 mi) south-east of the regional capital Kielce.
