= Krzcin =

- Village
- Location within Poland
- Coordinates: 50°33′47″N 21°36′6″E
- Country: Poland
- Voivodeship: Świętokrzyskie
- County: Sandomierz
- Gmina: Koprzywnica
- Population: 565

Krzcin [kʂt͡ɕin] is a village in the administrative district of Gmina Koprzywnica, within Sandomierz County, Świętokrzyskie Voivodeship, in south-central Poland. It lies approximately 4 km (2 mi) south-east of Koprzywnica, 17 km (11 mi) south-west of Sandomierz, and 78 km (48 mi) south-east of the regional capital Kielce.
