= Wygiełzów =

Wygiełzów may refer to the following places:

- Wygiełzów, Lesser Poland Voivodeship (south Poland)
- Wygiełzów, Bełchatów County in Łódź Voivodeship (central Poland)
- Wygiełzów, Zduńska Wola County in Łódź Voivodeship (central Poland)
- Wygiełzów, Świętokrzyskie Voivodeship (south-central Poland)
- Wygiełzów, Silesian Voivodeship (south Poland)
