= Skolankowska Wola =

- Village
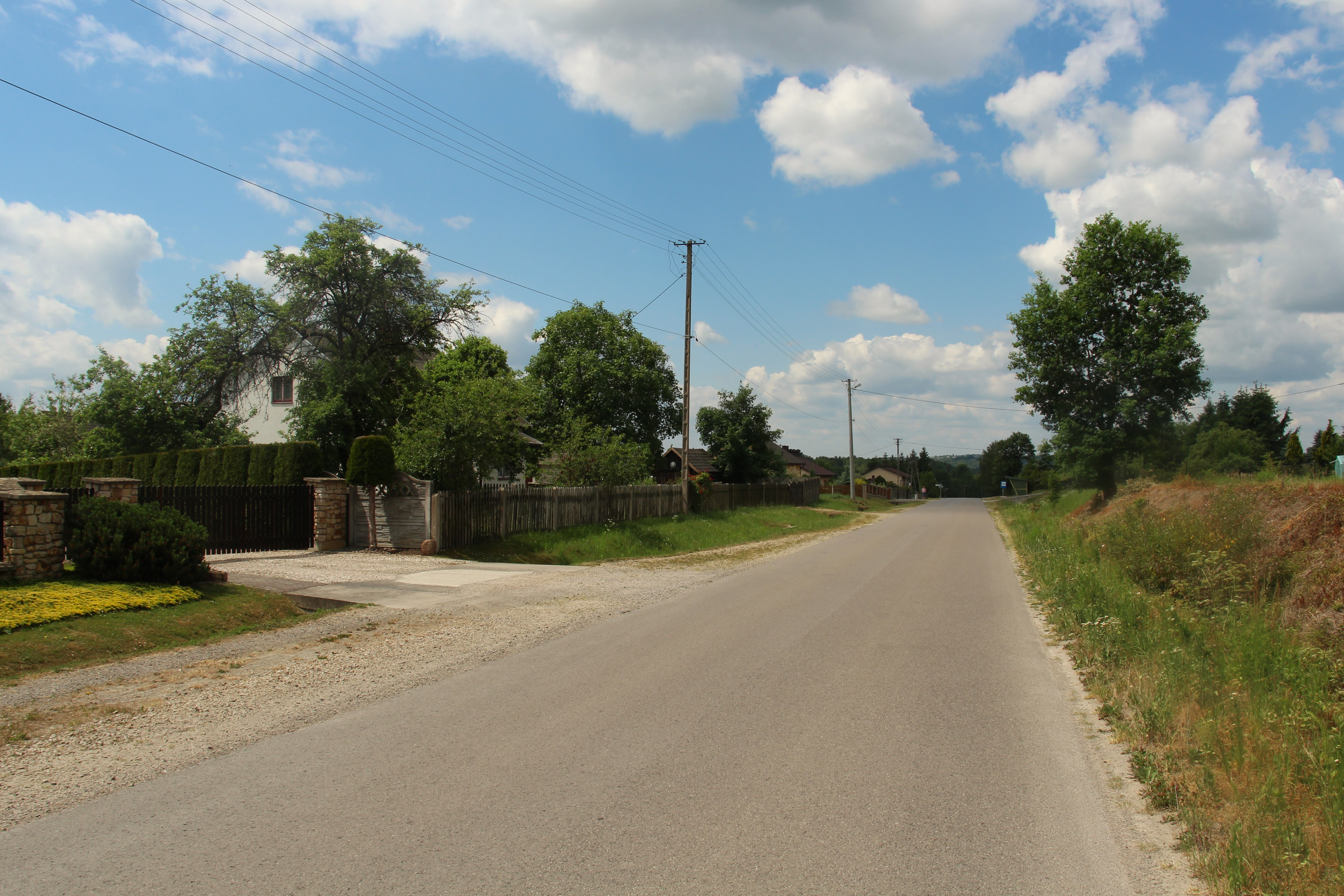

- Location within Poland
- Coordinates: 50°43′34″N 21°11′38″E
- Country: Poland
- Voivodeship: Świętokrzyskie
- County: Opatów
- Gmina: Iwaniska
- Population: 240

Skolankowska Wola [skɔlaŋˈkɔfska ˈvɔla] is a village in the administrative district of Gmina Iwaniska, within Opatów County, Świętokrzyskie Voivodeship, in south-central Poland. It lies approximately 6 km (4 mi) west of Iwaniska, 19 km (12 mi) south-west of Opatów, and 45 km (28 mi) south-east of the regional capital Kielce.
