= Przepiórów =

- Village
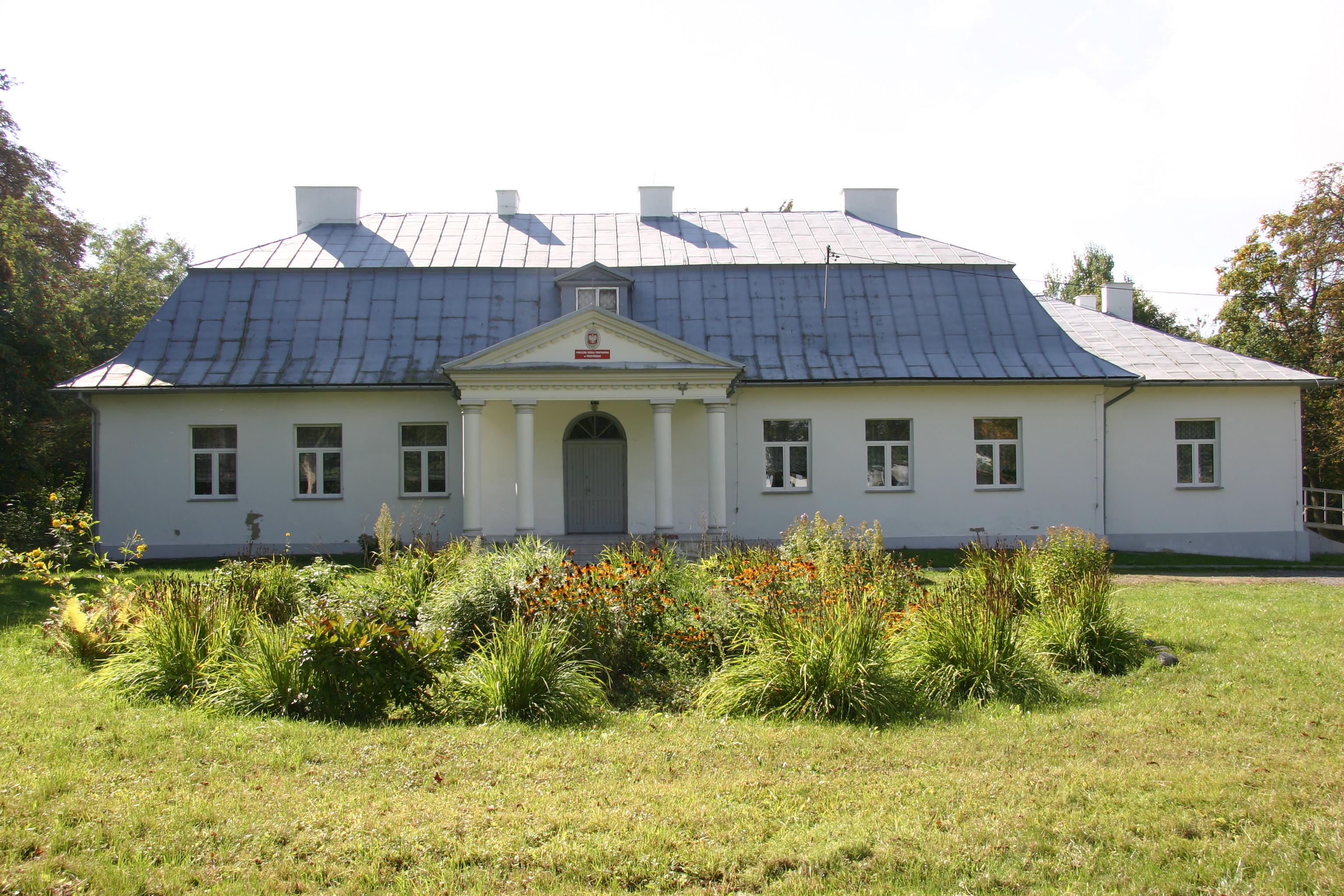

- Location within Poland
- Coordinates: 50°42′12″N 21°23′15″E
- Country: Poland
- Voivodeship: Świętokrzyskie
- County: Opatów
- Gmina: Iwaniska
- Population: 280

Przepiórów [pʂɛˈpjuruf] is a village in the administrative district of Gmina Iwaniska, within Opatów County, Świętokrzyskie Voivodeship, in south-central Poland. It lies approximately 9 km (6 mi) east of Iwaniska, 12 km (7 mi) south of Opatów, and 58 km (36 mi) east of the regional capital Kielce.
