= Toporów =

Toporów may refer to:

- Toporów, Łódź Voivodeship (central Poland)
- Toporów, Lubusz Voivodeship (west Poland)
- Toporów, Podkarpackie Voivodeship (south-east Poland)
- Toporów, Świętokrzyskie Voivodeship (south-central Poland)
- Toporów, Masovian Voivodeship (east-central Poland)
- Toporów, Greater Poland Voivodeship (west-central Poland)
- Prędocice (south-west Poland)
