= Zbigniewice =

- Village
- Location within Poland
- Coordinates: 50°37′N 21°29′E
- Country: Poland
- Voivodeship: Świętokrzyskie
- County: Sandomierz
- Gmina: Koprzywnica
- Population: 131

Zbigniewice [zbiɡɲɛˈvit͡sɛ] is a village in the administrative district of Gmina Koprzywnica, within Sandomierz County, Świętokrzyskie Voivodeship, in south-central Poland. It lies approximately 8 km (5 mi) west of Koprzywnica, 21 km (13 mi) west of Sandomierz, and 68 km (42 mi) south-east of the regional capital Kielce.
