= Boduszów =

- Village
- Location within Poland
- Coordinates: 50°43′4″N 21°21′17″E
- Country: Poland
- Voivodeship: Świętokrzyskie
- County: Opatów
- Gmina: Iwaniska
- Population: 160

Boduszów [bɔˈduʂuf] is a village in the administrative district of Gmina Iwaniska, within Opatów County, Świętokrzyskie Voivodeship, in south-central Poland. It lies approximately 6 km (4 mi) east of Iwaniska, 11 km (7 mi) south-west of Opatów, and 56 km (35 mi) east of the regional capital Kielce.
