= Gryzikamień =

- Village
- Location within Poland
- Coordinates: 50°42′15″N 21°15′11″E
- Country: Poland
- Voivodeship: Świętokrzyskie
- County: Opatów
- Gmina: Iwaniska
- Population (approx.): 130

Gryzikamień [ɡrɨʑiˈkamjɛɲ] is a village in the administrative district of Gmina Iwaniska, within Opatów County, Świętokrzyskie Voivodeship, in south-central Poland. It lies approximately 4 km (2 mi) south-west of Iwaniska, 17 km (11 mi) south-west of Opatów, and 49 km (30 mi) south-east of the regional capital Kielce.
