= Trzykosy =

- Village
- Location within Poland
- Coordinates: 50°37′N 21°32′E
- Country: Poland
- Voivodeship: Świętokrzyskie
- County: Sandomierz
- Gmina: Koprzywnica
- Population: 260

Trzykosy [tʂɨˈkɔsɨ] is a village in the administrative district of Gmina Koprzywnica, within Sandomierz County, Świętokrzyskie Voivodeship, in south-central Poland. It lies approximately 5 km (3 mi) north-west of Koprzywnica, 17 km (11 mi) south-west of Sandomierz, and 72 km (45 mi) south-east of the regional capital Kielce.
