= Niedźwice =

- Village
- Location within Poland
- Coordinates: 50°36′31″N 21°30′44″E
- Country: Poland
- Voivodeship: Świętokrzyskie
- County: Sandomierz
- Gmina: Koprzywnica
- Population: 321

Niedźwice [ɲɛd͡ʑˈvit͡sɛ] is a village in the administrative district of Gmina Koprzywnica, within Sandomierz County, Świętokrzyskie Voivodeship, in south-central Poland. It lies approximately 6 km (4 mi) west of Koprzywnica, 19 km (12 mi) south-west of Sandomierz, and 71 km (44 mi) south-east of the regional capital Kielce.
