= Nowa Łagowica =

- Village
- Location within Poland
- Coordinates: 50°42′19″N 21°10′46″E
- Country: Poland
- Voivodeship: Świętokrzyskie
- County: Opatów
- Gmina: Iwaniska
- Population: 60

Nowa Łagowica [ˈnɔva waɡɔˈvit͡sa] is a village in the administrative district of Gmina Iwaniska, within Opatów County, Świętokrzyskie Voivodeship, in south-central Poland. It lies approximately 8 km (5 mi) south-west of Iwaniska, 21 km (13 mi) south-west of Opatów, and 45 km (28 mi) south-east of the regional capital Kielce.
