= Krępa =

Krępa may refer to:

- Krępa, Lower Silesian Voivodeship (south-west Poland)
- Krępa, Kuyavian-Pomeranian Voivodeship (north-central Poland)
- Krępa, Lublin Voivodeship (east Poland)
- Krępa, Łowicz County in Łódź Voivodeship (central Poland)
- Krępa, Poddębice County in Łódź Voivodeship (central Poland)
- Krępa, Radomsko County in Łódź Voivodeship (central Poland)
- Krępa, Lesser Poland Voivodeship (south Poland)
- Krępa, Świętokrzyskie Voivodeship (south-central Poland)
- Krępa, Mława County in Masovian Voivodeship (east-central Poland)
- Krępa, Piaseczno County in Masovian Voivodeship (east-central Poland)
- Krępa, Greater Poland Voivodeship (west-central Poland)
- Krępa, Lubusz Voivodeship (west Poland)
- Krępa, West Pomeranian Voivodeship (north-west Poland)
