= Stara Łagowica =

- Village
- Location within Poland
- Coordinates: 50°42′36″N 21°8′35″E
- Country: Poland
- Voivodeship: Świętokrzyskie
- County: Opatów
- Gmina: Iwaniska
- Population: 160

Stara Łagowica [ˈstara waɡɔˈvit͡sa] is a village in the administrative district of Gmina Iwaniska, within Opatów County, Świętokrzyskie Voivodeship, in south-central Poland. It lies approximately 10 km (6 mi) west of Iwaniska, 23 km (14 mi) south-west of Opatów, and 42 km (26 mi) south-east of the regional capital Kielce.
