= Sośniczany =

- Village
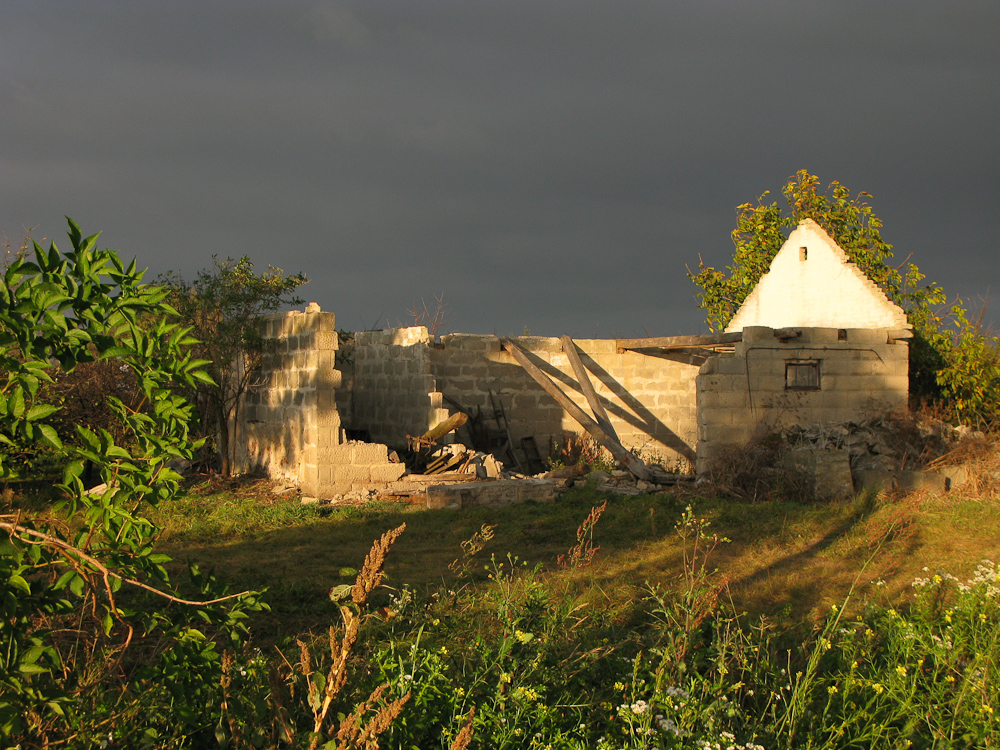

- Location within Poland
- Coordinates: 50°36′53″N 21°36′4″E
- Country: Poland
- Voivodeship: Świętokrzyskie
- County: Sandomierz
- Gmina: Koprzywnica
- Population: 431

Sośniczany [sɔɕniˈt͡ʂanɨ] is a village in the administrative district of Gmina Koprzywnica, within Sandomierz County, Świętokrzyskie Voivodeship, in south-central Poland. It lies approximately 3 km (2 mi) north-east of Koprzywnica, 13 km (8 mi) south-west of Sandomierz, and 76 km (47 mi) south-east of the regional capital Kielce.
