= Haliszka =

- Village
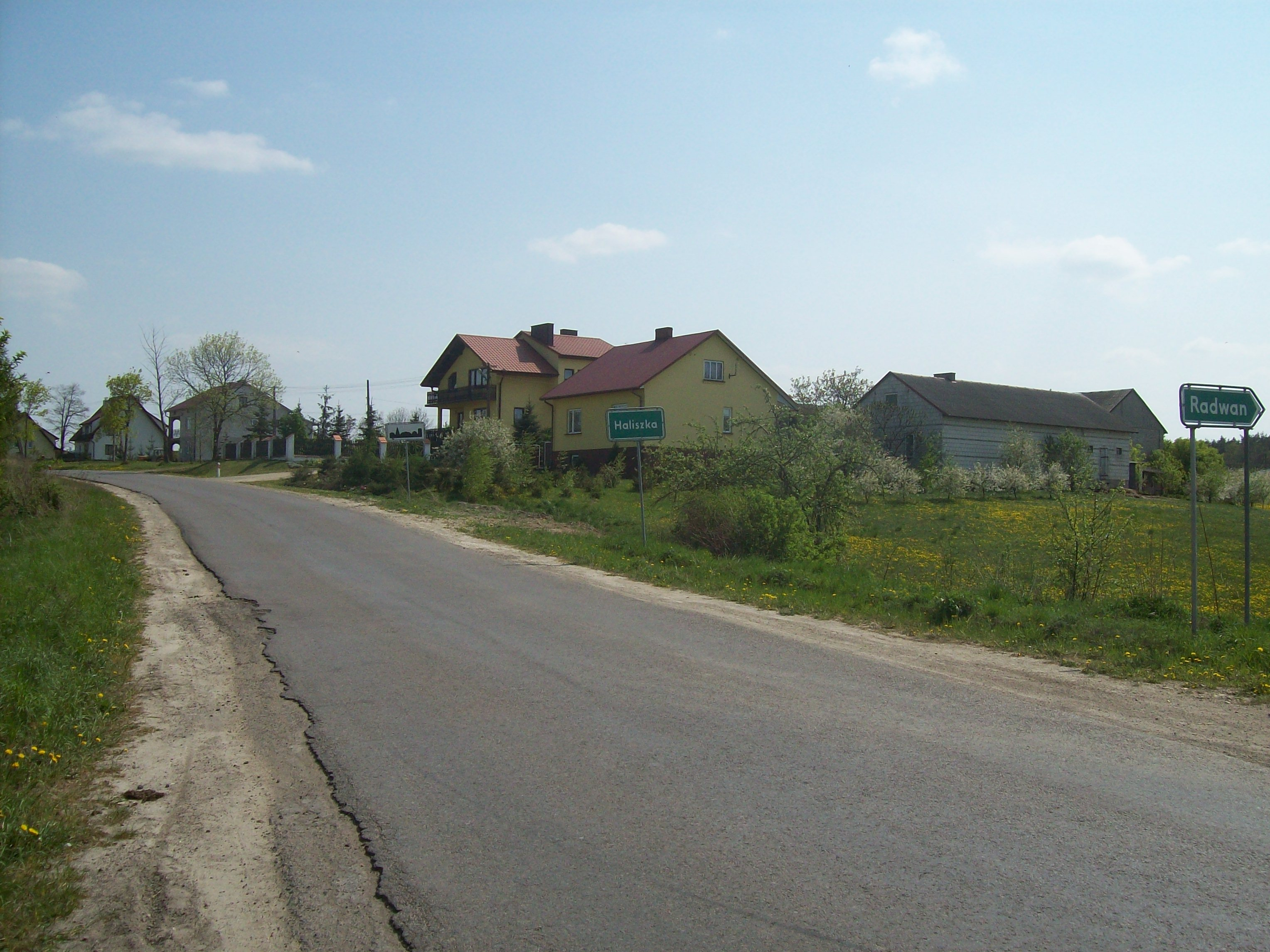

- Location within Poland
- Coordinates: 50°43′4″N 21°17′40″E
- Country: Poland
- Voivodeship: Świętokrzyskie
- County: Opatów
- Gmina: Iwaniska

Haliszka [xaˈliʂka] is a village in the administrative district of Gmina Iwaniska, within Opatów County, Świętokrzyskie Voivodeship, in north-central Poland. It lies approximately 3 km (2 mi) south-east of Iwaniska, 14 km (9 mi) south-west of Opatów, and 52 km (32 mi) east of the regional capital Kielce.
