= Jastrzębska Wola =

- Village
- Location within Poland
- Coordinates: 50°43′5″N 21°10′26″E
- Country: Poland
- Voivodeship: Świętokrzyskie
- County: Opatów
- Gmina: Iwaniska
- Population: 330

Jastrzębska Wola [jasˈtʂɛmpska ˈvɔla] is a village in the administrative district of Gmina Iwaniska, within Opatów County, Świętokrzyskie Voivodeship, in south-central Poland. It lies approximately 8 km (5 mi) west of Iwaniska, 21 km (13 mi) south-west of Opatów, and 44 km (27 mi) south-east of the regional capital Kielce.
