= Zaldów =

- Village
- Location within Poland
- Coordinates: 50°44′18″N 21°16′14″E
- Country: Poland
- Voivodeship: Świętokrzyskie
- County: Opatów
- Gmina: Iwaniska
- Population: 140

Zaldów [ˈzalduf] is a village in the administrative district of Gmina Iwaniska, within Opatów County, Świętokrzyskie Voivodeship, in south-central Poland. It lies approximately 1 km (1 mi) north-west of Iwaniska, 14 km (9 mi) south-west of Opatów, and 49 km (30 mi) east of the regional capital Kielce.
