= Tęcza =

Tęcza (Polish for rainbow) can refer to:

- Tęcza, Świętokrzyskie Voivodeship (a village in Poland)
- Tęcza (Warsaw) (a monument in Warsaw, Poland)
- Tęcza (music band) (Polish youth music group from the 90s)
