= Wzory =

- Village
- Location within Poland
- Coordinates: 50°43′29″N 21°15′12″E
- Country: Poland
- Voivodeship: Świętokrzyskie
- County: Opatów
- Gmina: Iwaniska
- Population: 360

Wzory [ˈvzɔrɨ] is a village in the administrative district of Gmina Iwaniska, within Opatów County, Świętokrzyskie Voivodeship, in south-central Poland. It lies approximately 2 km (1 mi) south-west of Iwaniska, 15 km (9 mi) south-west of Opatów, and 49 km (30 mi) east of the regional capital Kielce.
