= Borków, Opatów County =

Borków
- Village
- Location within Poland
- Coordinates: 50°42′51″N 21°22′49″E
- Country: Poland
- Voivodeship: Świętokrzyskie
- County: Opatów
- Gmina: Iwaniska
- Population: 150

Borków [ˈbɔrkuf] is a village in the administrative district of Gmina Iwaniska, within Opatów County, Świętokrzyskie Voivodeship, in south-central Poland. It lies approximately 8 km (5 mi) east of Iwaniska, 11 km (7 mi) south of Opatów, and 57 km (35 mi) east of the regional capital Kielce.
