= Łopatno =

- Village
- Location within Poland
- Coordinates: 50°41′41″N 21°15′40″E
- Country: Poland
- Voivodeship: Świętokrzyskie
- County: Opatów
- Gmina: Iwaniska
- Population: 290

Łopatno [wɔˈpatnɔ] is a village in the administrative district of Gmina Iwaniska, within Opatów County, Świętokrzyskie Voivodeship, in south-central Poland. It lies approximately 5 km (3 mi) south of Iwaniska, 17 km (11 mi) south-west of Opatów, and 50 km (31 mi) south-east of the regional capital Kielce.
