= Dziewiątle =

- Village
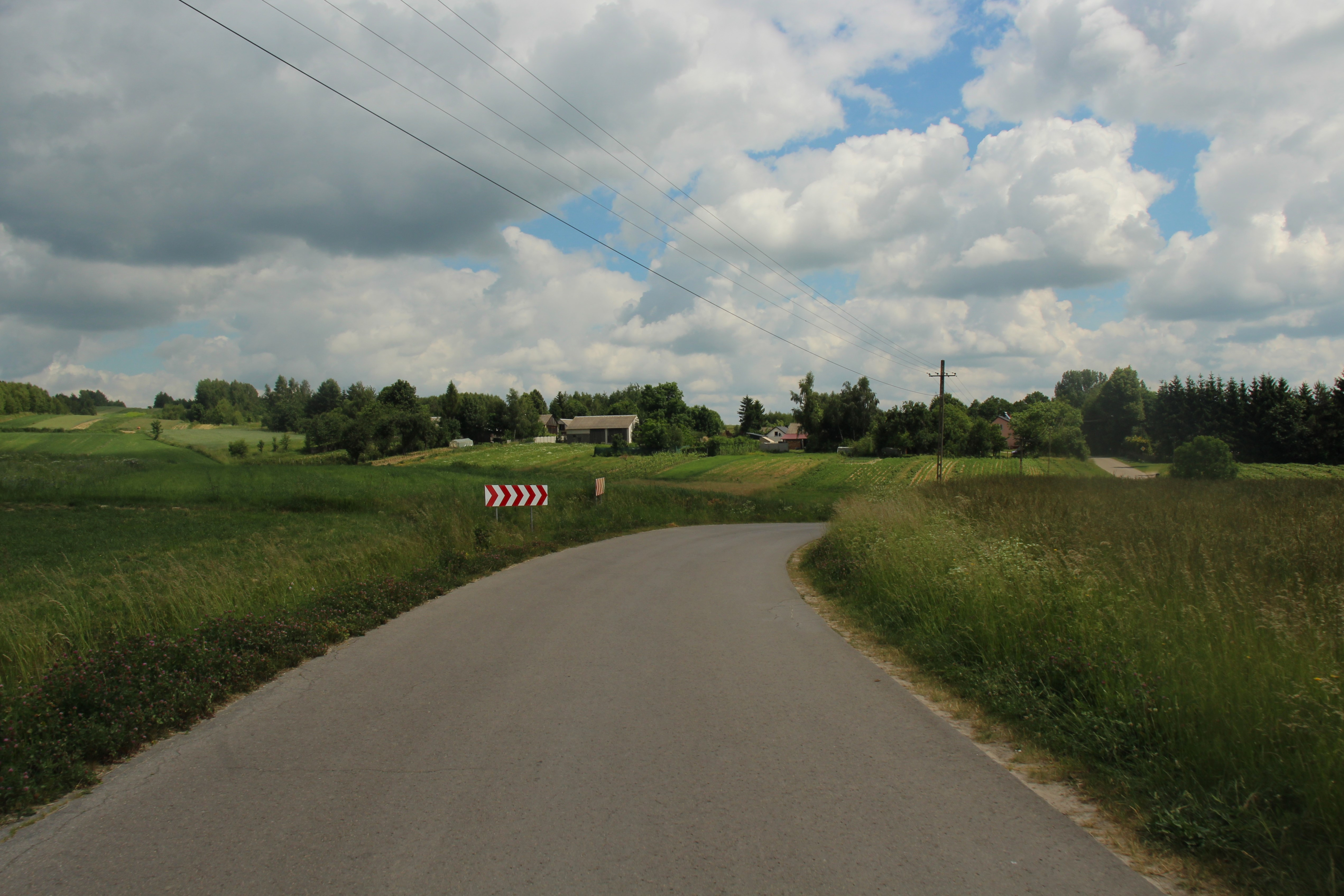

- Location within Poland
- Coordinates: 50°41′44″N 21°12′18″E
- Country: Poland
- Voivodeship: Świętokrzyskie
- County: Opatów
- Gmina: Iwaniska
- Population: 210

Dziewiątle [d͡ʑɛˈvjɔntlɛ] is a village in the administrative district of Gmina Iwaniska, within Opatów County, Świętokrzyskie Voivodeship, in south-central Poland. It lies approximately 7 km (4 mi) south-west of Iwaniska, 20 km (12 mi) south-west of Opatów, and 47 km (29 mi) south-east of the regional capital Kielce.
