= Zarudcze =

- Village
- Location within Poland
- Coordinates: 50°34′N 21°37′E
- Country: Poland
- Voivodeship: Świętokrzyskie
- County: Sandomierz
- Gmina: Koprzywnica

Zarudcze [zaˈrutt͡ʂɛ] is a village in the administrative district of Gmina Koprzywnica, within Sandomierz County, Świętokrzyskie Voivodeship, in south-central Poland. It lies approximately 4 km (2 mi) south-east of Koprzywnica, 17 km (11 mi) south-west of Sandomierz, and 79 km (49 mi) south-east of the regional capital Kielce.
