= Zbigniewice-Kolonia =

- Village
- Location within Poland
- Coordinates: 50°37′0″N 21°30′16″E
- Country: Poland
- Voivodeship: Świętokrzyskie
- County: Sandomierz
- Gmina: Koprzywnica
- Population: 296

Zbigniewice-Kolonia [zbiɡɲɛˈvit͡sɛ kɔˈlɔɲa] is a village in the administrative district of Gmina Koprzywnica, within Sandomierz County, Świętokrzyskie Voivodeship, in south-central Poland. It lies approximately 7 km (4 mi) north-west of Koprzywnica, 19 km (12 mi) south-west of Sandomierz, and 70 km (43 mi) south-east of the regional capital Kielce.
