= Kasper Cichocki =

Polish polemicist and theologian (1545–1616)

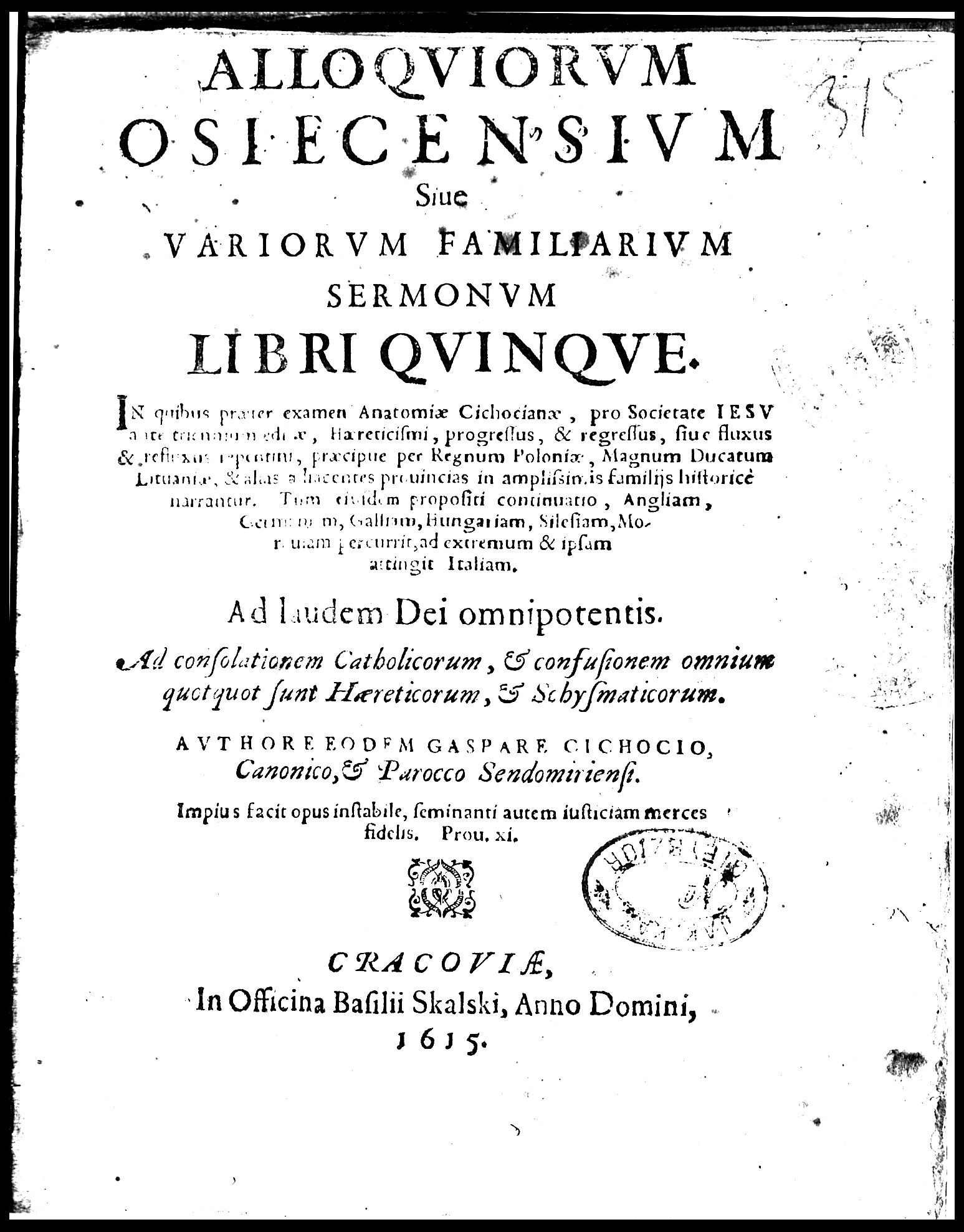
Alloqviorvm Osiecensium, 1615

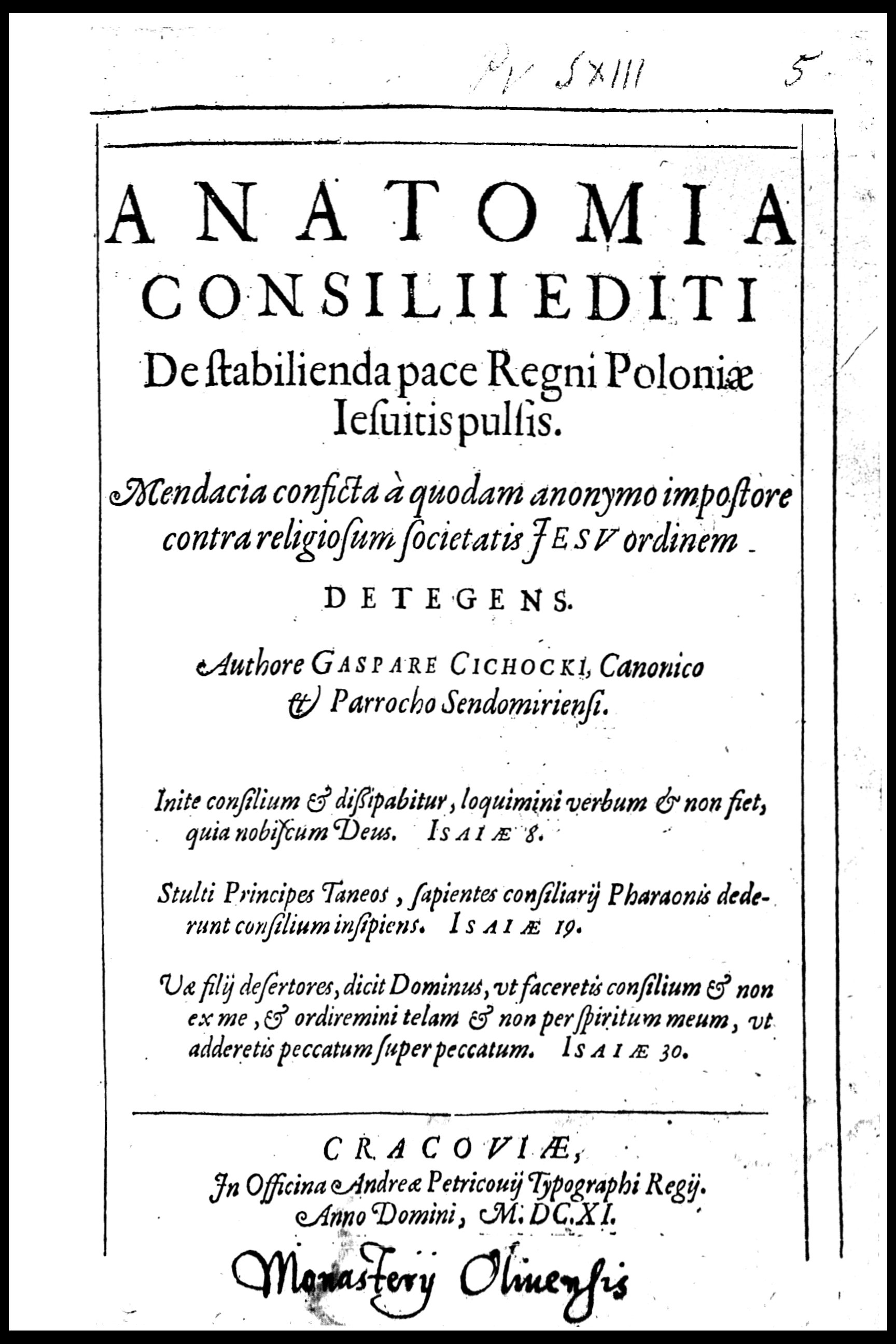
Anatomia consilii, 1611

Kasper Cichocki (1545–1616) was a Polish ecclesiastic, theologian and polemicist. He served as canon of Kraków and Sandomierz, canon-prebend of Mydłów, co-founder of the Jesuit college in Sandomierz, pastor of św. Piotra church in Sandomierz and one of the town's most outstanding Counter Reformation writers.

== Life ==
He was born in Tarnów to Stanislaw, a middle-class man from the town.

== Works ==
- Anatomia consilii editi de stabilienda pace Regni Poloniae Iesuitis pulsis, Kraków 1611, published by A. Piotrkowczyk
- Alloquiorum Osiecensium sive variorum familiarum sermonum libri V, 1611, 1614 and 1615

== Bibliography (in Polish) ==
- Do P. Gorczyna (Gorczyńskiego), Kraków lub Wilno, 1572–1574; do J. Młodeckiego, Rzym: 17 marca i 3 października 1585; 18 kwietnia oraz 16 i 20 października 1586; wyd. T. Wierzbowski Materiały do dziejów piśmiennictwa polskiego, t. 1, Warsaw 1900
- Kwit, Wilno, 14 lipca 1588, wyd. T. Wierzbowski Materiały do dziejów piśmiennictwa polskiego, t. 1, Warsaw 1900
- Materiały dot. zatargu o dzieło Alloquiorum Osiecensium sive variorum familiarum sermonum libri V, (mowa J. Dickensona z 20 października 1615, odpowiedź kanclerza F. Kryskiego z 1615)
- Wacław Urban Kasper Cichocki - najwybitniejszy pisarz kontrreformacji sandomierskiej, Rocznik Świętokrzyski 1993, t. 20, pp. 131–142
- Bibliografia Literatury Polskiej - Nowy Korbut, t. 2 Piśmiennictwo Staropolskie, Państwowy Instytut Wydawniczy, Warsaw 1964, pp. 90–91
- Henryk Barycz: Cichocki Kasper. W: Polski Słownik Biograficzny. T. 4: Chwalczewski Jerzy – Dąbrowski Ignacy. Kraków: Polska Akademia Umiejętności, 1938, pp. 21–22. Reprint wydany przez Zakład Narodowy im. Ossolińskich, Wrocław, 1989, ISBN 83-04-03291-0.
