= Kamieniec =

Kamieniec may refer to several places:

== Poland ==
- Kamieniec, Gmina Kłecko, Gniezno County in Greater Poland Voivodeship (west-central Poland)
- Kamieniec, Gmina Trzemeszno, Gniezno County in Greater Poland Voivodeship (west-central Poland)
- Kamieniec, Gmina Kamieniec, Grodzisk County in Greater Poland Voivodeship (west-central Poland)
- Kamieniec, Aleksandrów County in Kuyavian-Pomeranian Voivodeship (north-central Poland)
- Kamieniec, Radziejów County in Kuyavian-Pomeranian Voivodeship (central Poland)
- Kamieniec, Toruń County in Kuyavian-Pomeranian Voivodeship (north-central Poland)
- Kamieniec, Lesser Poland Voivodeship (south Poland)
- Kamieniec, Łódź Voivodeship (central Poland)
- Kamieniec, Lower Silesian Voivodeship (south-west Poland)
- Kamieniec Wrocławski in Lower Silesian Voivodeship (south-west Poland)
- Kamieniec Ząbkowicki in Lower Silesian Voivodeship (south-west Poland)
- Kamieniec, Gostynin County in Masovian Voivodeship (central Poland)
- Kamieniec, Siedlce County in Masovian Voivodeship (east-central Poland)
- Kamieniec, Pomeranian Voivodeship (north Poland)
- Kamieniec, Silesian Voivodeship (south Poland)
- Kamieniec, Kielce County in Świętokrzyskie Voivodeship (south-central Poland)
- Kamieniec, Opatów County in Świętokrzyskie Voivodeship (south-central Poland)
- Kamieniec, Sandomierz County in Świętokrzyskie Voivodeship (south-central Poland)
- Kamieniec, Staszów County in Świętokrzyskie Voivodeship (south-central Poland)
- Kamieniec, Warmian-Masurian Voivodeship (north Poland)
- Kamieniec, West Pomeranian Voivodeship (north-west Poland)

== Historical Polish name in other places ==
- Kamieniec Podolski, now Kamianets-Podilskyi, a city in Ukraine
- Kamieniec, now Kamenz, a town in Germany
- Kamieniec Litewski, now Kamyanyets, a town in Belarus

== See also ==
- Kamieniec Castle
- Kamenec (disambiguation)
- Kamenets (disambiguation)
