= Podzaldów =

- Village
- Location within Poland
- Coordinates: 50°44′11″N 21°15′42″E
- Country: Poland
- Voivodeship: Świętokrzyskie
- County: Opatów
- Gmina: Iwaniska
- Population: 49

Podzaldów [pɔˈd͡zalduf] is a village in the administrative district of Gmina Iwaniska, within Opatów County, Świętokrzyskie Voivodeship, in south-central Poland. It lies approximately 2 km (1 mi) north-west of Iwaniska, 14 km (9 mi) south-west of Opatów, and 49 km (30 mi) east of the regional capital Kielce.
