= Łukowiec, Świętokrzyskie Voivodeship =

Łukowiec
- Village
- Location within Poland
- Coordinates: 50°34′25″N 21°37′54″E
- Country: Poland
- Voivodeship: Świętokrzyskie
- County: Sandomierz
- Gmina: Koprzywnica
- Population: 300

Łukowiec [wuˈkɔvjɛt͡s] is a village in the administrative district of Gmina Koprzywnica, within Sandomierz County, Świętokrzyskie Voivodeship, in south-central Poland. It lies approximately 4 km (2 mi) south-east of Koprzywnica, 15 km (9 mi) south-west of Sandomierz, and 80 km (50 mi) south-east of the regional capital Kielce.
