= Stobiec, Świętokrzyskie Voivodeship =

Village in Poland

Stobiec
- Village
- Location within Poland
- Coordinates: 50°44′38″N 21°14′31″E
- Country: Poland
- Voivodeship: Świętokrzyskie
- County: Opatów
- Gmina: Iwaniska
- Population: 440

Stobiec [ˈstɔbjɛt͡s] is a village in the administrative district of Gmina Iwaniska, within Opatów County, Świętokrzyskie Voivodeship, in south-central Poland. It lies approximately 3 km (2 mi) north-west of Iwaniska, 15 km (9 mi) south-west of Opatów, and 47 km (29 mi) east of the regional capital Kielce.
