= Marianów, Opatów County =

Marianów
- Village
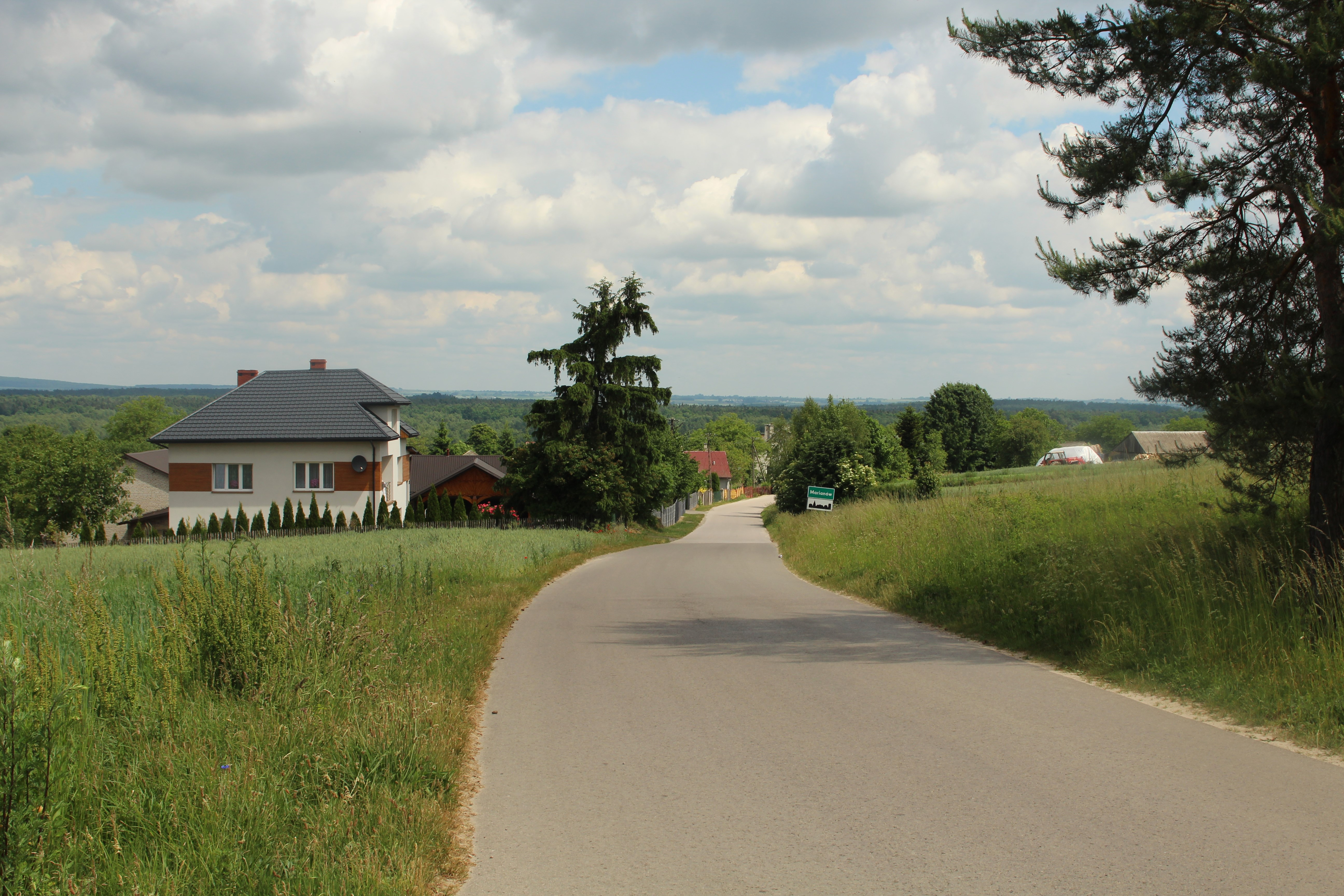

- Location within Poland
- Coordinates: 50°42′8″N 21°13′29″E
- Country: Poland
- Voivodeship: Świętokrzyskie
- County: Opatów
- Gmina: Iwaniska
- Population: 260

Marianów [maˈrjanuf] is a village in the administrative district of Gmina Iwaniska, within Opatów County, Świętokrzyskie Voivodeship, in south-central Poland. It lies approximately 5 km (3 mi) south-west of Iwaniska, 19 km (12 mi) south-west of Opatów, and 48 km (30 mi) south-east of the regional capital Kielce.
