= Gmina Koprzywnica =

Gmina Koprzywnica Koprzywnica Commune
- Gmina
- Coat of arms

- Location within Poland
- Coordinates (Koprzywnica): 50°35′26″N 21°35′1″E
- Country: Poland
- Voivodeship: Świętokrzyskie
- County: Sandomierz
- Seat: Koprzywnica

Area
  - Total: 69.19 km^{2} (26.71 sq mi)

Population (2013)
  - Total: 6,901
  - Density: 99.74/km^{2} (258.3/sq mi)
  - Urban: 2,575
  - Rural: 4,326
- Website: http://www.koprzywnica.pl

Gmina Koprzywnica is an urban-rural gmina (administrative district) in Sandomierz County, Świętokrzyskie Voivodeship, in south-central Poland. Its seat is the town of Koprzywnica, which lies approximately 16 kilometres (10 mi) south-west of Sandomierz and 76 km (47 mi) south-east of the regional capital Kielce.

The gmina covers an area of 69.19 square kilometres (26.7 sq mi), and as of 2006 its total population is 7,043 (out of which the population of Koprzywnica amounts to 2,531, and the population of the rural part of the gmina is 4,512).

== Villages ==
Apart from the town of Koprzywnica, Gmina Koprzywnica contains the villages and settlements of Beszyce, Błonie, Ciszyca, Dmosice, Gnieszowice, Kamieniec, Krzcin, Łukowiec, Niedźwice, Postronna, Sośniczany, Trzykosy, Zarudcze, Zbigniewice and Zbigniewice-Kolonia.

== Neighbouring gminas ==
Gmina Koprzywnica is bordered by the city of Tarnobrzeg and by the gminas of Klimontów, Łoniów and Samborzec.
