= Kamieniec, Opatów County =

Kamieniec
- Village
- Location within Poland
- Coordinates: 50°41′59″N 21°22′13″E
- Country: Poland
- Voivodeship: Świętokrzyskie
- County: Opatów
- Gmina: Iwaniska
- Population: 220

Kamieniec [kaˈmjɛɲɛt͡s] is a village in the administrative district of Gmina Iwaniska, within Opatów County, Świętokrzyskie Voivodeship, in south-central Poland. It lies approximately 8 km (5 mi) south-east of Iwaniska, 13 km (8 mi) south of Opatów, and 57 km (35 mi) east of the regional capital Kielce.
