= Alfons Dunin-Borkowski =

Polish painter

- Born: Alfons Dunin-Borkowski; Planta, Poland
- Died: 1918; Raśniki, Poland
- Education: School of Arts in Warsaw, Jan Matejko Academy of Fine Arts in Kraków
- Known for: Painting
- Movement: Realism

Alfons Dunin-Borkowski (1850–1918) was a Polish painter, son of Mikołaj Dunin-Borkowski and Julianna Gromadzińska.

He was born in Planta. Between 1876 and 1879, the painter completed his art studies at the School of Arts in Warsaw under Wojciech Gerson and Aleksander Kamiński as well as under Władysław Łuszczkiewicz and Leopold Loeffler between 1879 and 1887 at the Jan Matejko Academy of Fine Arts in Kraków. Afterwards, Alfons took part in Jan Matejko's compositional classes. In 1888, he returned to his family settlement. In 1898, the artist moved to his wife's property in the Vilnius Region. After his wife's death, Alfons moved to Bikbarda in Perm Krai where he spent his time painting. From 1905, he lived in Suchedniów in modern-day Holy Cross Voivodeship. He died in 1918 in Raśniki.

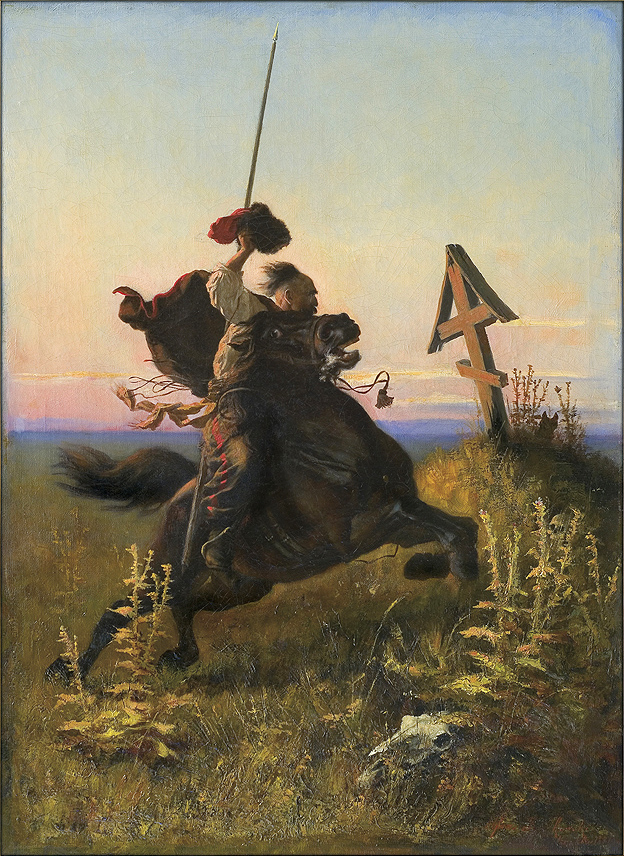
Cossack in the steppe
(1881)

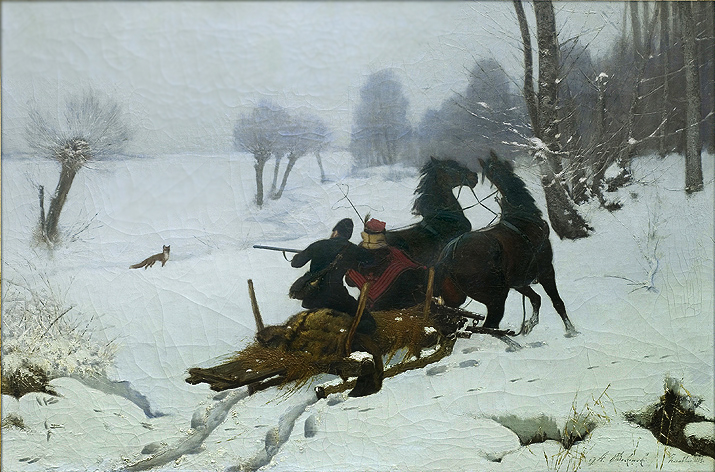
Fox hunting
(1889)
