= Planta, Świętokrzyskie Voivodeship =

Planta
- Village
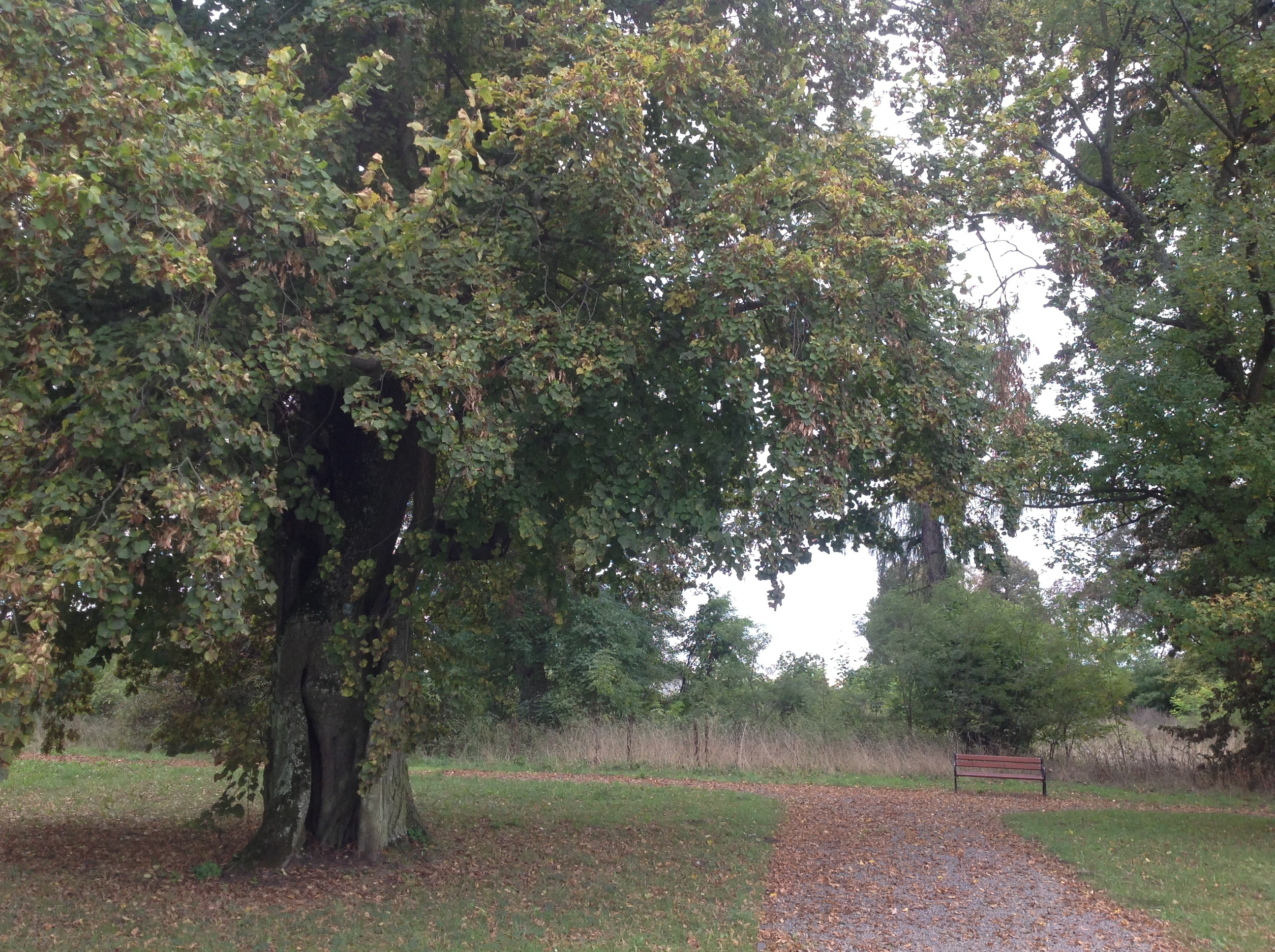
- Park

- Location within Poland
- Coordinates: 50°44′5″N 21°18′7″E
- Country: Poland
- Voivodeship: Świętokrzyskie
- County: Opatów
- Gmina: Iwaniska

Planta [ˈplanta] is a village in the administrative district of Gmina Iwaniska, within Opatów County, Świętokrzyskie Voivodeship, in south-central Poland. It lies approximately 2 km (1 mi) east of Iwaniska, 12 km (7 mi) south-west of Opatów, and 51 km (32 mi) east of the regional capital Kielce.
