= Krępa, Świętokrzyskie Voivodeship =

Krępa
- Village
- Location within Poland
- Coordinates: 50°43′43″N 21°20′47″E
- Country: Poland
- Voivodeship: Świętokrzyskie
- County: Opatów
- Gmina: Iwaniska

Krępa [ˈkrɛmpa] is a village in the administrative district of Gmina Iwaniska, within Opatów County, Świętokrzyskie Voivodeship, in south-central Poland. It lies approximately 6 km (4 mi) east of Iwaniska, 11 km (7 mi) south-west of Opatów, and 55 km (34 mi) east of the regional capital Kielce.
