= Gmina Iwaniska =

Gmina Iwaniska Iwaniska Commune
- Gmina
- Coat of arms
- Interactive map of Gmina Iwaniska
- Coordinates (Iwaniska): 50°43′54″N 21°16′30″E
- Country: Poland
- Voivodeship: Świętokrzyskie
- County: Opatów
- Seat: Iwaniska

Area
  - Total: 105.03 km^{2} (40.55 sq mi)

Population (2006)
  - Total: 7,107
  - Density: 67.67/km^{2} (175.3/sq mi)
- Website: www.iwaniska.eu

Gmina Iwaniska is a rural gmina (administrative district) in Opatów County, Świętokrzyskie Voivodeship, in south-central Poland. Its seat is the village of Iwaniska, which lies approximately 14 kilometres (9 mi) south-west of Opatów and 50 km (31 mi) east of the regional capital Kielce.

The gmina covers an area of 105.03 square kilometres (40.6 sq mi), and as of 2006 its total population is 7,107.

== Villages ==
Gmina Iwaniska contains the villages and settlements of Boduszów, Borków, Dziewiątle, Garbowice, Gryzikamień, Haliszka, Iwaniska, Jastrzębska Wola, Kamieniec, Kamienna Góra, Kopiec, Krępa, Kujawy, Łopatno, Marianów, Mydłów, Nowa Łagowica, Planta, Podzaldów, Przepiórów, Radwan, Skolankowska Wola, Sobiekurów, Stara Łagowica, Stobiec, Tęcza, Toporów, Ujazd, Wojnowice, Wygiełzów, Wzory, Zaldów and Zielonka.

== Neighbouring gminas ==
Gmina Iwaniska is bordered by the gminas of Baćkowice, Bogoria, Klimontów, Łagów, Lipnik, Opatów and Raków.
