= Wygiełzów, Świętokrzyskie Voivodeship =

Wygiełzów
- Village
- Location within Poland
- Coordinates: 50°41′42″N 21°14′21″E
- Country: Poland
- Voivodeship: Świętokrzyskie
- County: Opatów
- Gmina: Iwaniska
- Elevation: 350 m (1,150 ft)
- Population: 140

Wygiełzów [vɨˈɡʲɛu̯zuf] is a village in the administrative district of Gmina Iwaniska, within Opatów County, Świętokrzyskie Voivodeship, in south-central Poland. It lies approximately 5 km (3 mi) south-west of Iwaniska, 18 km (11 mi) south-west of Opatów, and 49 km (30 mi) south-east of the regional capital Kielce.
