= Mydłów =

- Village
- Location within Poland
- Coordinates: 50°43′39″N 21°22′52″E
- Country: Poland
- Voivodeship: Świętokrzyskie
- County: Opatów
- Gmina: Iwaniska
- Population: 460

Mydłów [ˈmɨdwuf] is a village in the administrative district of Gmina Iwaniska, within Opatów County, Świętokrzyskie Voivodeship, in south-central Poland. It lies approximately 8 km (5 mi) east of Iwaniska, 10 km (6 mi) south of Opatów, and 57 km (35 mi) east of the regional capital Kielce.

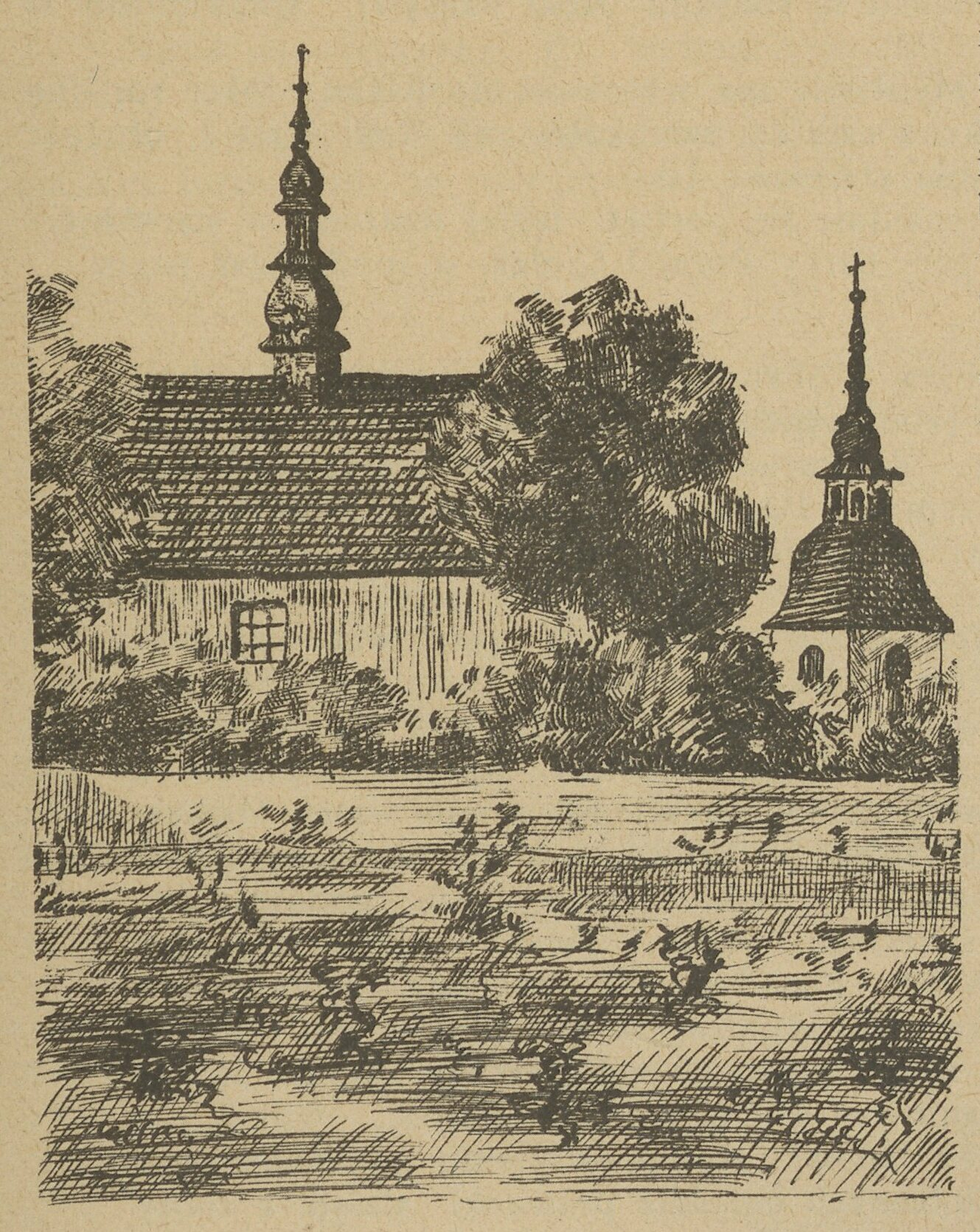
Church of Assumption of the Blessed Virgin Mary, before 1907
