= Kopiec, Świętokrzyskie Voivodeship =

Kopiec
- Village
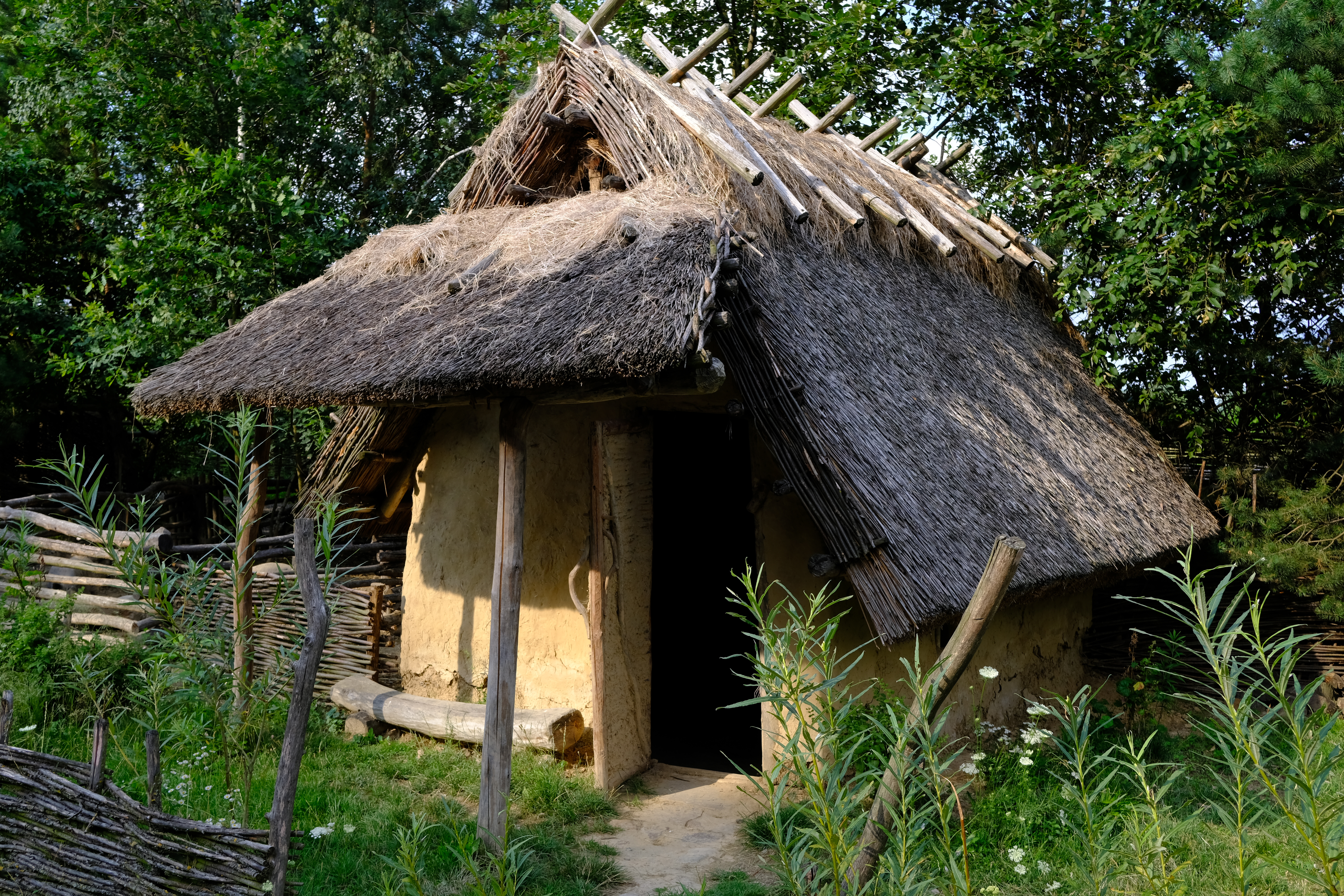
- Neolithic settlement

- Location within Poland
- Coordinates: 50°42′45″N 21°20′29″E
- Country: Poland
- Voivodeship: Świętokrzyskie
- County: Opatów
- Gmina: Iwaniska
- Population: 80

Kopiec [ˈkɔpjɛt͡s] is a village in the administrative district of Gmina Iwaniska, within Opatów County, Świętokrzyskie Voivodeship, in south-central Poland. It lies approximately 6 km (4 mi) south-east of Iwaniska, 12 km (7 mi) south-west of Opatów, and 55 km (34 mi) east of the regional capital Kielce.
