= Zielonka, Świętokrzyskie Voivodeship =

Zielonka
- Village
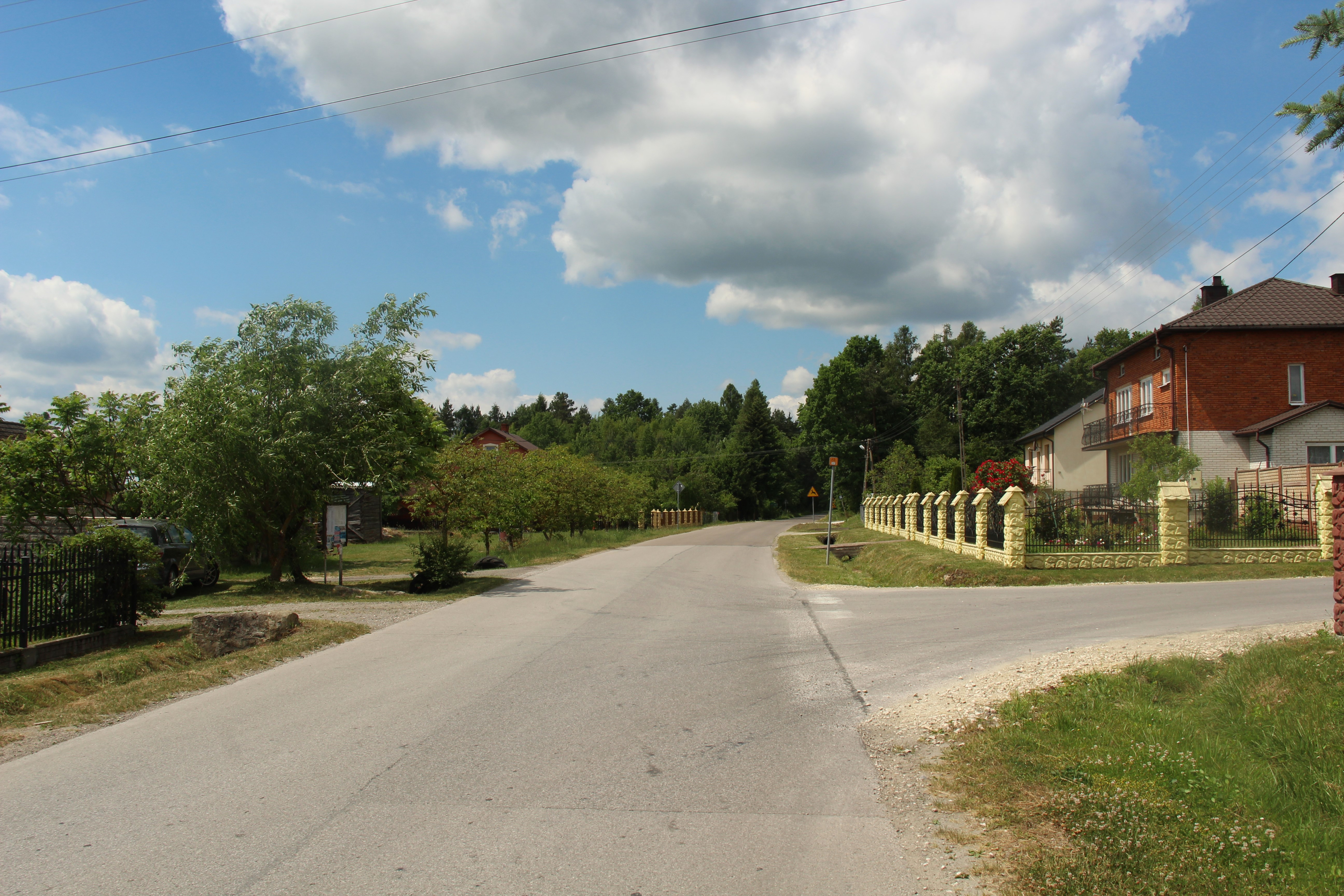

- Location within Poland
- Coordinates: 50°43′52″N 21°14′44″E
- Country: Poland
- Voivodeship: Świętokrzyskie
- County: Opatów
- Gmina: Iwaniska

Zielonka [ʑɛˈlɔŋka] is a village in the administrative district of Gmina Iwaniska, within Opatów County, Świętokrzyskie Voivodeship, in south-central Poland.
