= Kamenets =

Kamenets, Kamyenyets or Kamianets may refer to places:

- Kamyenyets, Belarus
- Kamyenyets district, Belarus
- Kamenets, Kardzhali Province, Bulgaria
- Kamianets-Podilskyi, a town in Ukraine
- Kamianets-Podilskyi Raion, a district in Ukraine
- Kamianets Okruha, a former administrative subdivision of the Ukrainian SSR
- Khmelnytskyi Oblast, a province in western Ukraine also known as Kamianets-Podilskyi Oblast

== See also ==
- Kamenitsa (disambiguation)
- Kamenec (disambiguation)
- Kamieniec (disambiguation)
