= Kamenec (Rokycany District) =

- Municipality
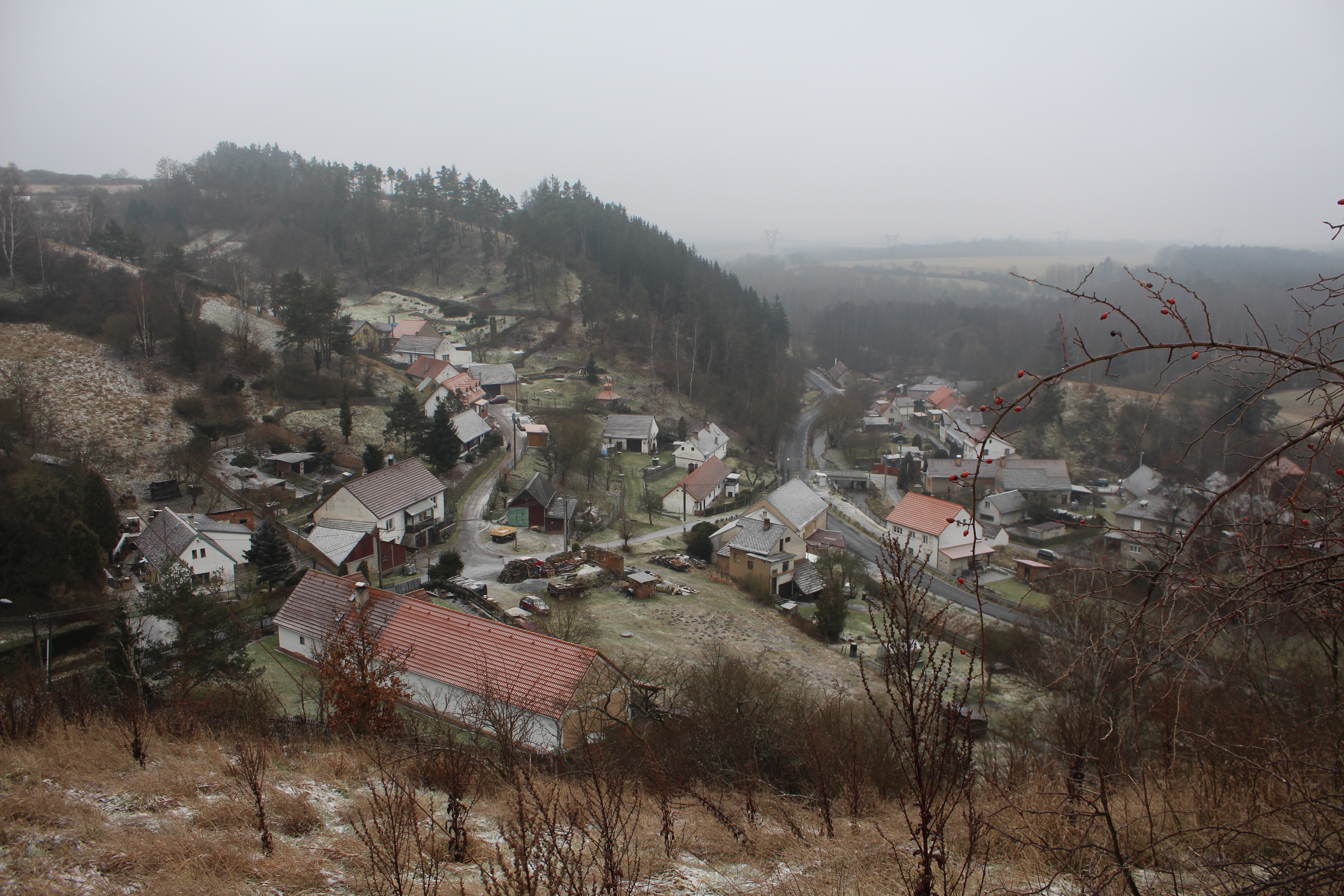
- General view

- Location in the Czech Republic
- Coordinates: 49°52′52″N 13°35′47″E
- Country: Czech Republic
- Region: Plzeň
- District: Rokycany
- Founded: 1780

Area
  - Total: 1.75 km^{2} (0.68 sq mi)
- Elevation: 362 m (1,188 ft)

Population (2026-01-01)
  - Total: 81
  - Density: 46/km^{2} (120/sq mi)
- Time zone: UTC+1 (CET)
  - Summer (DST): UTC+2 (CEST)
- Postal code: 338 28
- Website: www.obeckamenec.cz

Kamenec is a municipality and village in Rokycany District in the Plzeň Region of the Czech Republic. It has about 80 inhabitants.

== Etymology ==
The village was named after the product that was mined here (kamenec = 'alum').

== Geography ==
Kamenec is located about 15 kilometres (9 mi) north of Rokycany and 21 km (13 mi) northeast of Plzeň. It lies in the Plasy Uplands. The highest point is a nameless hill at 468 m (1,535 ft) above sea level. The stream Radnický potok flows through the municipality.

== History ==
Kamenec was founded in 1780 by Kašpar Ledebour, when the area was part of his Liblín estate. Alum slate mines were established here, from which alum was extracted. From 1840, sodium silicate was produced here.

From 1850 to 1950, Kamenec was part of Němčovice. From 1950 to 1980, it was an independent municipality. From 1 April 1980 to 23 November 1990, Kamenec was a municipal part of Radnice.

== Demographics ==
Historical population

Year	Pop.	±%
1869	309	—
1880	284	−8.1%
1890	310	+9.2%
1900	326	+5.2%
1910	270	−17.2%

Year	Pop.	±%
1921	272	+0.7%
1930	233	−14.3%
1950	150	−35.6%
1961	145	−3.3%
1970	91	−37.2%

Year	Pop.	±%
1980	66	−27.5%
1991	47	−28.8%
2001	53	+12.8%
2011	60	+13.2%
2021	66	+10.0%

Source: Censuses

== Transport ==
There are no railways or major roads passing through the municipality.

== Sights ==
There are no protected cultural monuments in the municipality.
