= Tęcza, Świętokrzyskie Voivodeship =

Tęcza
- Village
- Location within Poland
- Coordinates: 50°43′48″N 21°18′52″E
- Country: Poland
- Voivodeship: Świętokrzyskie
- County: Opatów
- Gmina: Iwaniska
- Population: 380

Tęcza [ˈtɛnt͡ʂa] is a village in the administrative district of Gmina Iwaniska, within Opatów County, Świętokrzyskie Voivodeship, in south-central Poland. It lies approximately 3 km (2 mi) east of Iwaniska, 12 km (7 mi) south-west of Opatów, and 52 km (32 mi) east of the regional capital Kielce.
