= Kamieniec, Sandomierz County =

Kamieniec
- Village
- Location within Poland
- Coordinates: 50°36′N 21°39′E
- Country: Poland
- Voivodeship: Świętokrzyskie
- County: Sandomierz
- Gmina: Koprzywnica
- Population: 122

Kamieniec [kaˈmjɛɲɛt͡s] is a village in the administrative district of Gmina Koprzywnica, within Sandomierz County, Świętokrzyskie Voivodeship, in south-central Poland. It lies approximately 5 km (3 mi) east of Koprzywnica, 12 km (7 mi) south-west of Sandomierz, and 80 km (50 mi) south-east of the regional capital Kielce.
