= Toporów, Świętokrzyskie Voivodeship =

Toporów
- Village
- Location within Poland
- Coordinates: 50°43′18″N 21°19′47″E
- Country: Poland
- Voivodeship: Świętokrzyskie
- County: Opatów
- Gmina: Iwaniska
- Population: 170

Toporów [tɔˈpɔruf] is a village in the administrative district of Gmina Iwaniska, within Opatów County, Świętokrzyskie Voivodeship, in south-central Poland. It lies approximately 5 km (3 mi) east of Iwaniska, 12 km (7 mi) south-west of Opatów, and 54 km (34 mi) east of the regional capital Kielce.
