= Kamenec u Poličky =

- Municipality
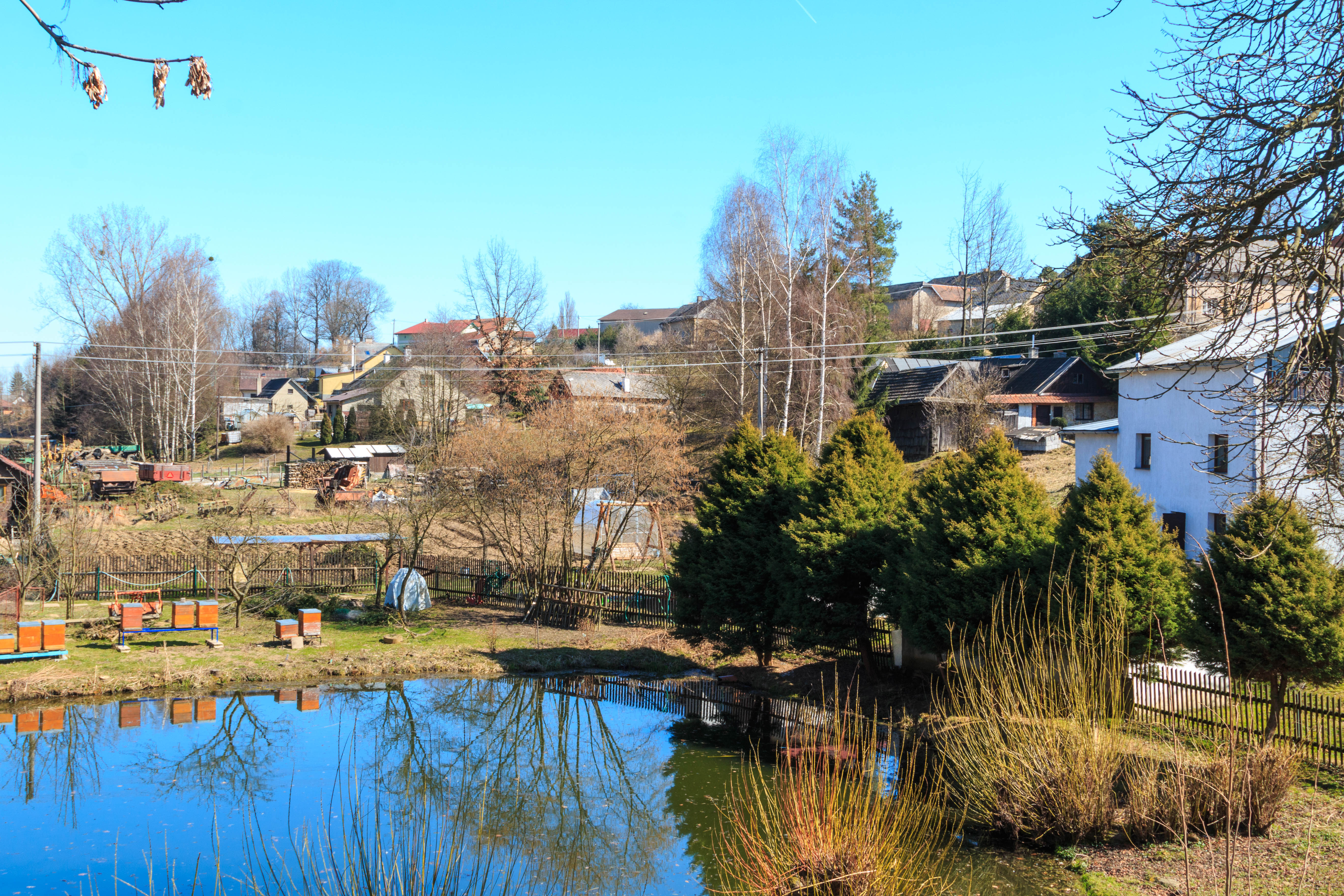
- Centre of Kamenec u Poličky

- Flag Coat of arms

- Location in the Czech Republic
- Coordinates: 49°42′28″N 16°14′2″E
- Country: Czech Republic
- Region: Pardubice
- District: Svitavy
- First mentioned: 1557

Area
  - Total: 8.03 km^{2} (3.10 sq mi)
- Elevation: 550 m (1,800 ft)

Population (2026-01-01)
  - Total: 598
  - Density: 74.5/km^{2} (193/sq mi)
- Time zone: UTC+1 (CET)
  - Summer (DST): UTC+2 (CEST)
- Postal code: 572 01
- Website: www.obec-kamenec.cz

Kamenec u Poličky is a municipality and village in Svitavy District in the Pardubice Region of the Czech Republic. It has about 600 inhabitants.

Kamenec u Poličky lies approximately 18 kilometres (11 mi) west of Svitavy, 49 km (30 mi) southeast of Pardubice, and 137 km (85 mi) east of Prague.

== Administrative division ==
Kamenec u Poličky consists of two municipal parts (in brackets population according to the 2021 census):

- Kamenec u Poličky (525)
- Jelínek (7)

== Demographics ==
Historical population
Year	Pop.	±%
1869	729	—
1880	718	−1.5%
1890	703	−2.1%
1900	789	+12.2%
1910	793	+0.5%
1921	707	−10.8%
1930	794	+12.3%
1950	555	−30.1%
1961	594	+7.0%
1970	559	−5.9%
1980	504	−9.8%
1991	465	−7.7%
2001	504	+8.4%
2011	554	+9.9%
2021	532	−4.0%
Source: Censuses
