= Borkovsky =

Borkovsky (Czech and Slovak Borkovský, feminine Borkovská) is a Slavic surname, a variant of Polish Borkowski. The Russian and Belarusian feminine form of the surname is Borkovskaya. The Ukrainian feminine form is Borkovska.

Notable people with the surname include:

- Ivan Borkovský (1897–1976), Czechoslovak archaeologist
- Joshua Borkovsky (born 1952), Israeli artist
