= Kamenets, Kardzhali Province =

Kamenets Каменец
- Village
- Location within Bulgaria
- Coordinates: 41.4667°N 25.4167°E
- Country: Bulgaria
- Province: Kardzhali Province
- Municipality: Momchilgrad
- Elevation: 366 m (1,201 ft)
- Time zone: UTC+2 (EET)
  - Summer (DST): UTC+3 (EEST)

Kamenets is a village in Momchilgrad Municipality, Kardzhali Province, southern Bulgaria. In Bulgaria there are two other villages sharing the same name, Kamenets, Pleven Province, and Kamenets, Yambol Province.
