= Anna Borkowska =

Anna Borkowska may refer to:

- Anna Borkowska (Sister Bertranda) (1906–1988), Polish nun and anti-Nazi resistance member
- Anna Borkowska (actress) (1916–2008), Iranian actress
