= Němčovice =

- Municipality
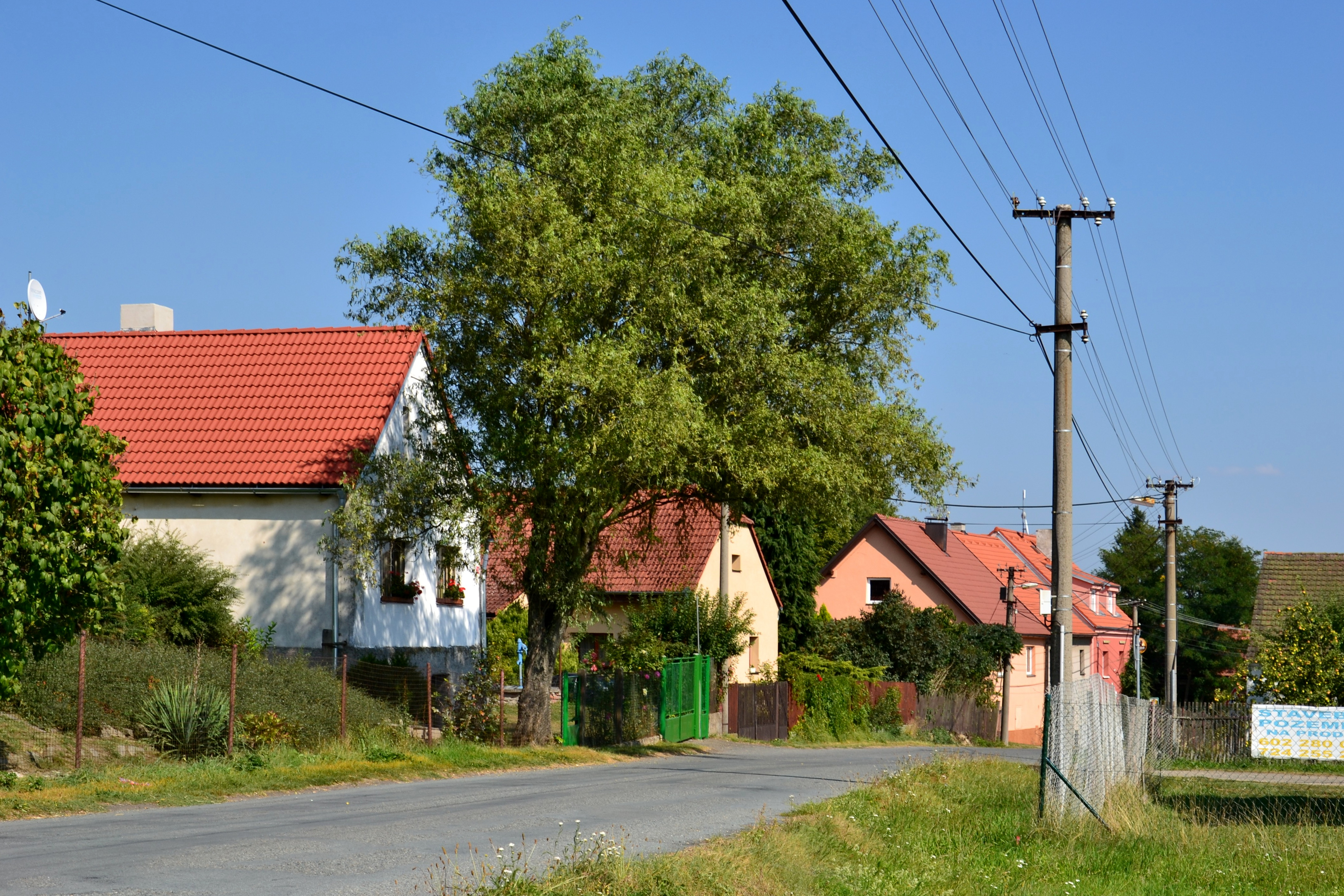
- Western edge of Němčovice

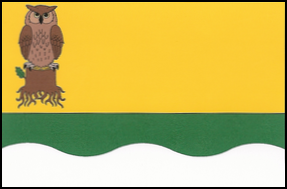
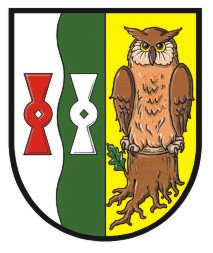
- Flag Coat of arms

- Location in the Czech Republic
- Coordinates: 49°52′37″N 13°34′30″E
- Country: Czech Republic
- Region: Plzeň
- District: Rokycany
- First mentioned: 1240

Area
  - Total: 11.01 km^{2} (4.25 sq mi)
- Elevation: 395 m (1,296 ft)

Population (2026-01-01)
  - Total: 190
  - Density: 17/km^{2} (45/sq mi)
- Time zone: UTC+1 (CET)
  - Summer (DST): UTC+2 (CEST)
- Postal code: 338 24
- Website: www.nemcovice.cz

Němčovice is a municipality and village in Rokycany District in the Plzeň Region of the Czech Republic. It has about 200 inhabitants.

Němčovice lies approximately 15 kilometres (9 mi) north of Rokycany, 21 km (13 mi) north-east of Plzeň, and 65 km (40 mi) west of Prague.

== Administrative division ==
Němčovice consists of two municipal parts (in brackets population according to the 2021 census):

- Němčovice (120)
- Olešná (51)

== Demographics ==
Historical population
Year	Pop.	±%
1869	609	—
1880	620	+1.8%
1890	547	−11.8%
1900	524	−4.2%
1910	455	−13.2%
1921	448	−1.5%
1930	407	−9.2%
1950	306	−24.8%
1961	275	−10.1%
1970	180	−34.5%
1980	143	−20.6%
1991	105	−26.6%
2001	101	−3.8%
2011	113	+11.9%
2021	171	+51.3%
Source: Censuses
