= Koprzywnica =

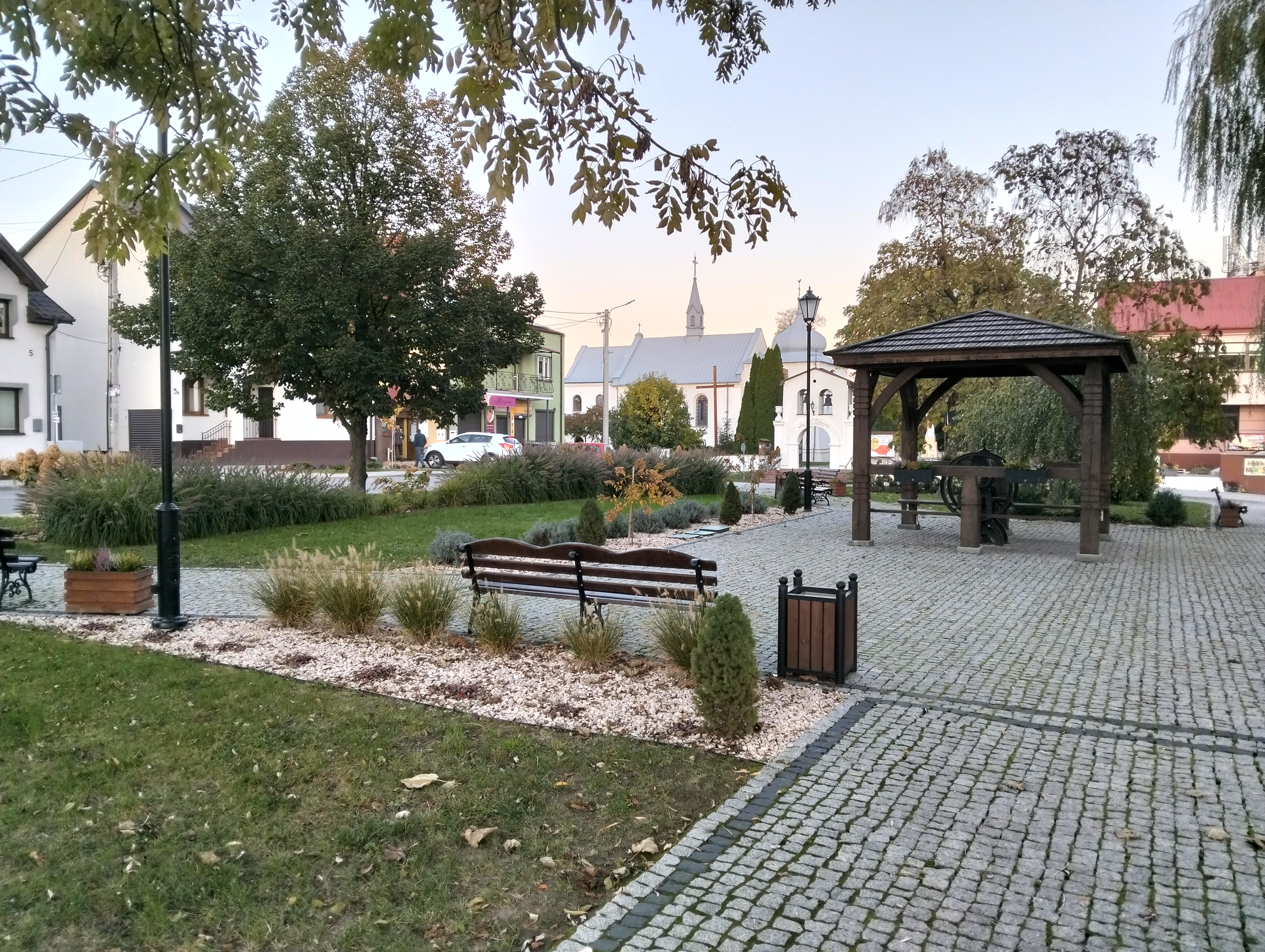
- Market Square in Koprzywnica

- Coat of arms

- Location within Poland
- Coordinates: 50°35′26″N 21°35′1″E
- Country: Poland
- Voivodeship: Świętokrzyskie
- County: Sandomierz
- Gmina: Koprzywnica
- Town rights: 1268

Area
  - Total: 17.9 km^{2} (6.9 sq mi)

Population (2006)
  - Total: 2,531
  - Density: 141/km^{2} (366/sq mi)
- Time zone: UTC+1 (CET)
  - Summer (DST): UTC+2 (CEST)
- Postal code: 27-660
- Area code: +48 15
- Car plates: TSA
- Website: http://www.koprzywnica.eu/

Koprzywnica [kɔpʂɨvˈɲit͡sa] is a town in Sandomierz County, Świętokrzyskie Voivodeship, Poland, with 2,546 inhabitants (2004). Koprzywnica lies on the Koprzywianka river, in Lesser Poland. It is one of the oldest urban centers of the province, located along the Tarnobrzeg Route of historic Lesser Polish Way of St. James, and on the National Road Nr. 79, which goes from Kraków to Sandomierz.

== History ==
The settlement of Koprzywnica existed already at the beginning of the 12th century, and at that time was called Pokrzywnica. In 1185, Prince Casimir II the Just brought here the Cistercians, and in the same year, local nobleman Mikołaj Bogoria Skotnicki of Bogorya coat of arms presented Koprzywnica to the monks, together with several villages in the area. By order of the Duke of Sandomierz, Bolesław V the Chaste, Koprzywnica was granted town rights (see Magdeburg Rights), on December 8, 1268. Due to the presence of the Cistercians, Koprzywnica prospered, and from the 14th to the 17th century it was among medium-sized towns of Lesser Poland. In 1606, it was one of the centers of a rokosz (armed rebellion) of the nobility against King Sigismund III Vasa, organized by Mikołaj Zebrzydowski. In 1655–1660 Koprzywnica was destroyed during the Swedish invasion of Poland. The town never fully recovered from the losses.

Following the late-18th-century Partitions of Poland, it was annexed by Austria. After the Polish victory in the Austro-Polish War of 1809, it was regained by Poles and included within the short-lived Duchy of Warsaw. After its dissolution, since 1815, it was part of the Russian-controlled Congress Poland. As punishment for the January Uprising, Russian authorities reduced it to the status of a village in 1869.

Following the German-Soviet invasion of Poland, which started World War II in September 1939, it was occupied by Germany. Koprzywnica's ghetto was liquidated by German occupiers on 31 October 1942, when 1,800 Jews from the ghetto were transported by a Holocaust train to the Treblinka extermination camp and gassed to death, including expellees from Radom and Vienna.

Koprzywnica became a town again on January 1, 2001.

== Points of interest ==
Among notable points of interest in Koprzywnica are:

- Cistercian church of St. Florian (13th century, destroyed in the Mongol invasion of Poland in 1241, rebuilt and remodeled in the 15th and 18th centuries)
- Eastern wing of the former Cistercian monastery (13th century)
- Market square with Our Lady of the Rosary church (1470)
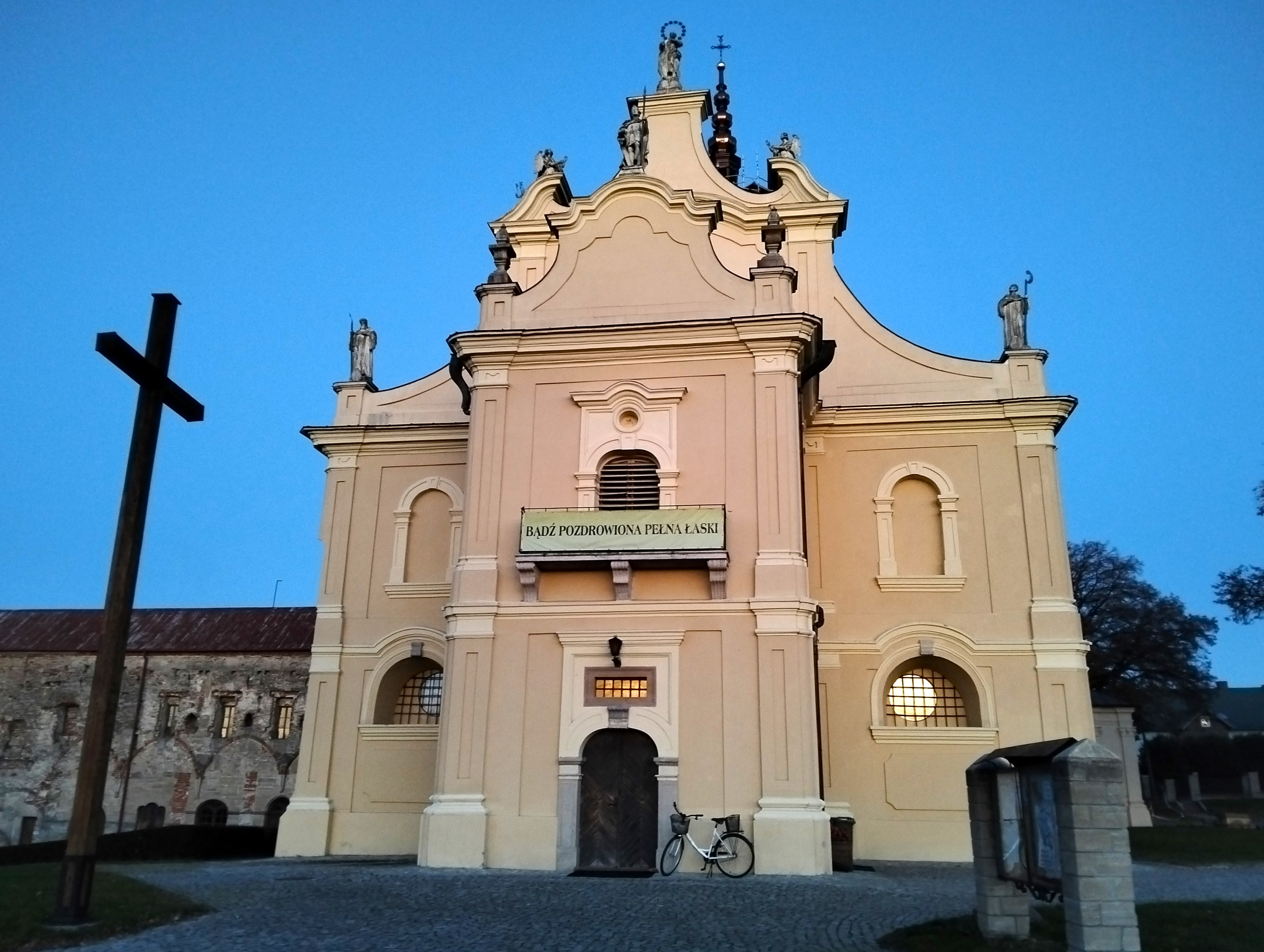
Saint Florian church

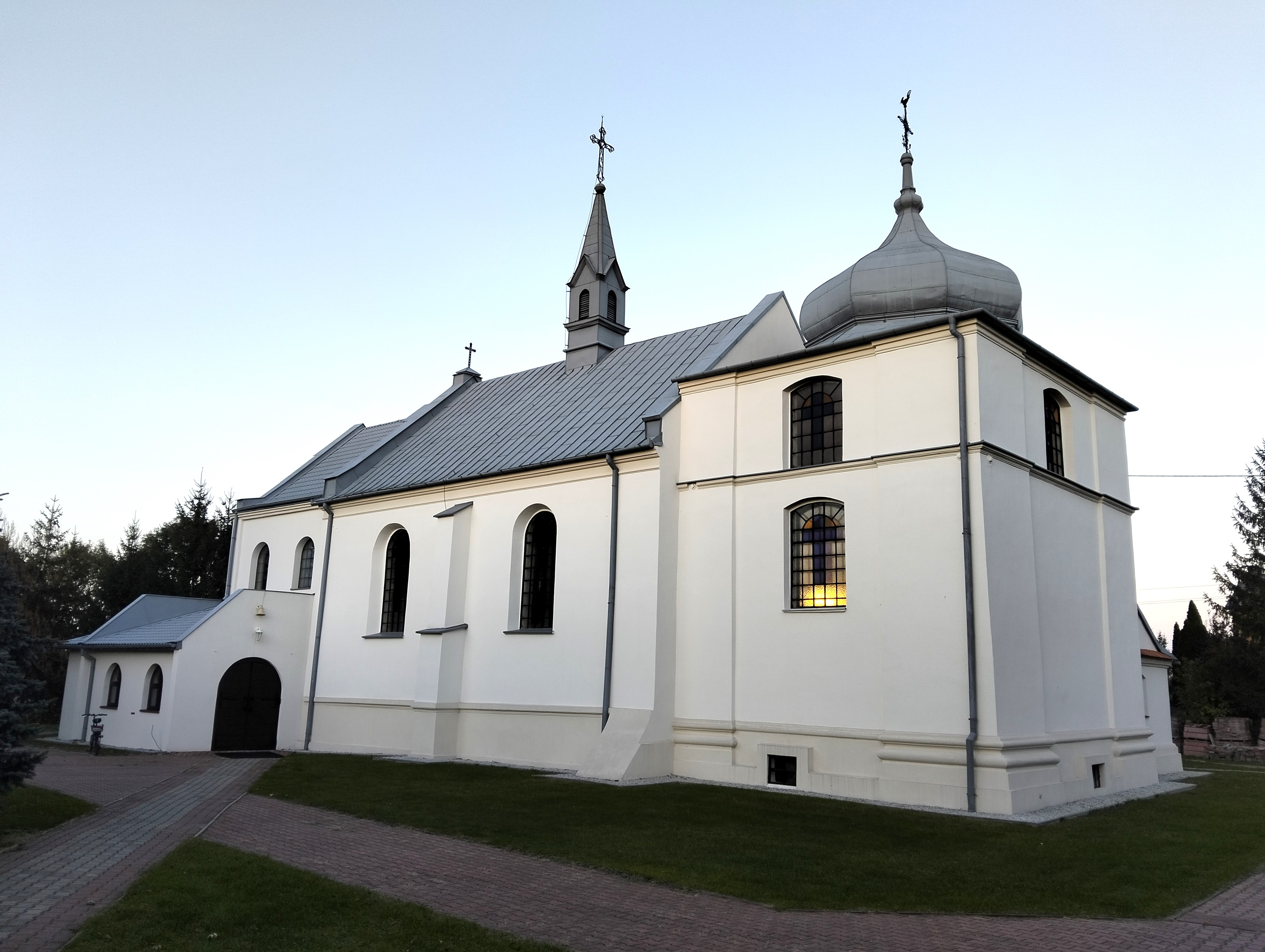
Our Lady of the Rosary church

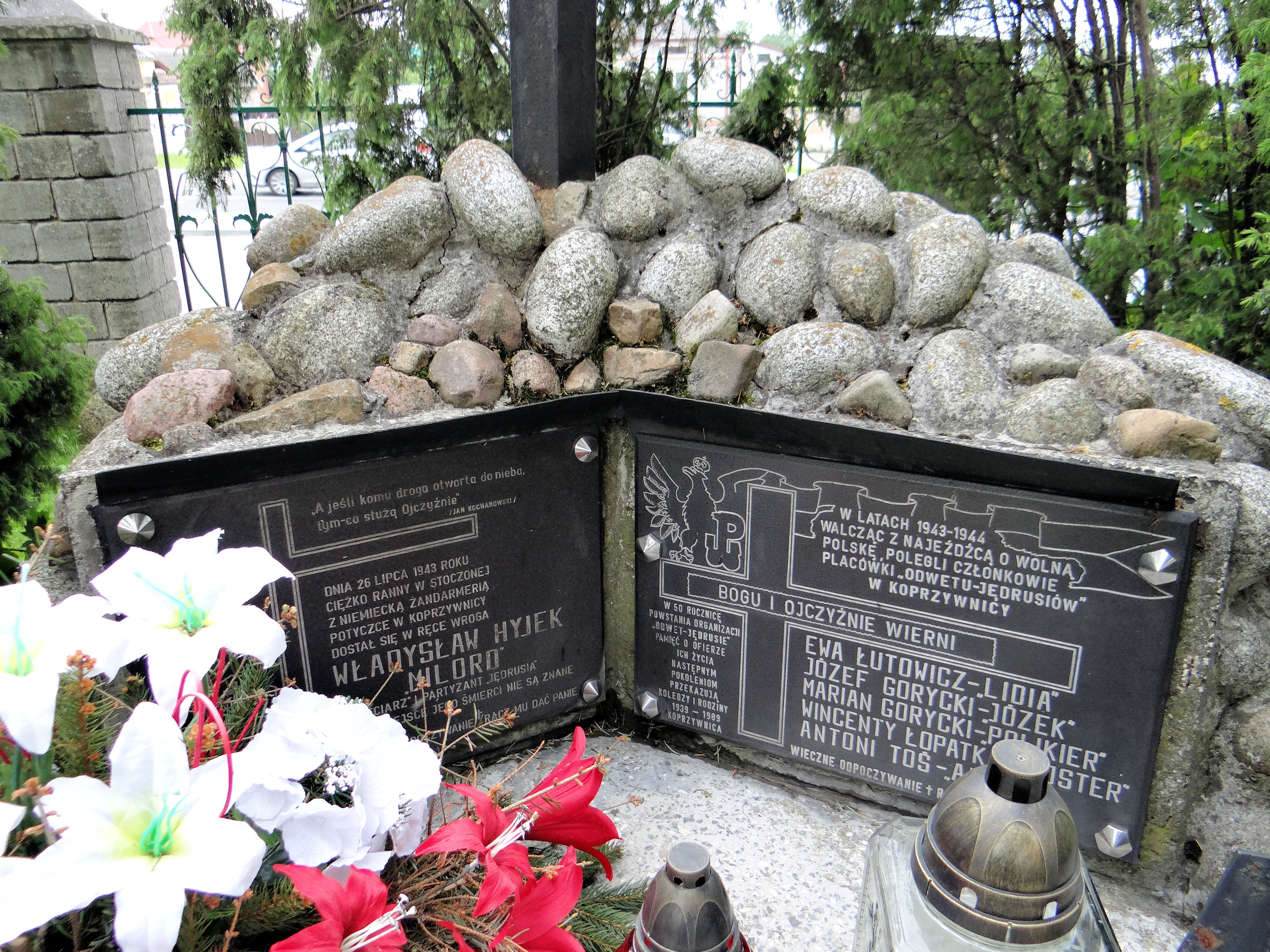
Memorial to the Polish resistance movement in World War II
