= Iwaniska =

- Town
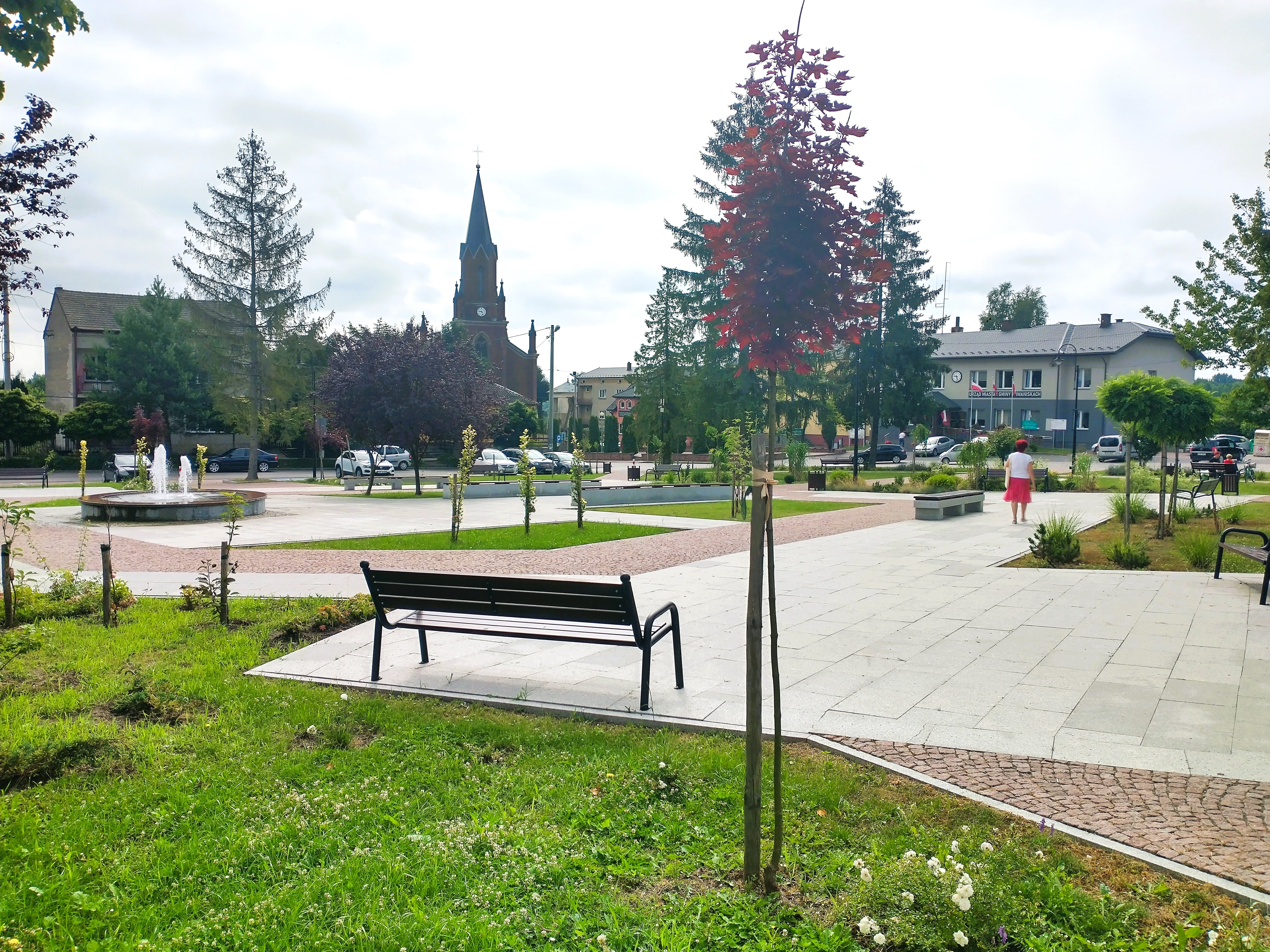
- Market Square with the Saint Catherine church in the background

- Coat of arms

- Location within Poland
- Coordinates: 50°43′54″N 21°16′30″E
- Country: Poland
- Voivodeship: Świętokrzyskie
- County: Opatów
- Gmina: Iwaniska
- Town rights: 1403

Population
  - Total: 1,300
- Time zone: UTC+1 (CET)
  - Summer (DST): UTC+2 (CEST)
- Vehicle registration: TOP

Iwaniska [ivaˈniska] is a town in Opatów County, Świętokrzyskie Voivodeship, in south-central Poland. It is the seat of the gmina (administrative district) called Gmina Iwaniska. It lies approximately 14 km (9 mi) south-west of Opatów and 50 km (31 mi) east of the regional capital Kielce. The town has a population of 1,300.

Iwaniska lies on the Koprzywianka river in historic Lesser Poland, in the southeastern corner of the Świętokrzyskie Mountains. Approximately 2 kilometers southeast of Iwaniska the complex of the Krzyżtopór castle is located.

== History ==
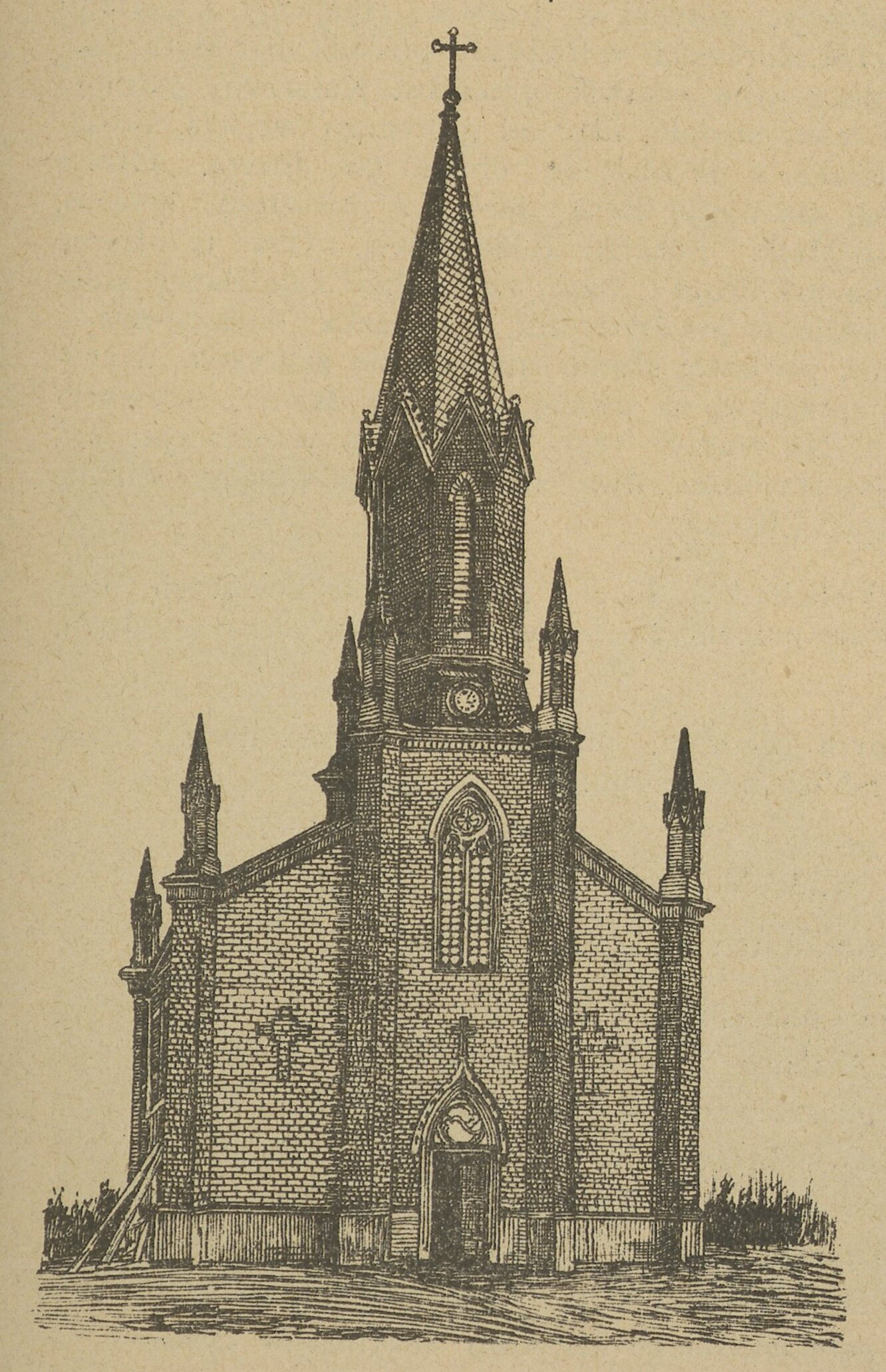
Church before 1907

The history of Iwaniska dates back to the late 13th century, when it was a settlement called Onispowka, located in feudal Poland’s Land of Sandomierz. In 1403, the influential Zborowski family decided to found a town here, and at that time, Iwaniska was called Unieszow or Uneszow. The current name came into use in the mid-15th century. During the Protestant Reformation, Iwaniska was a center of Calvinism, here a synod took place in 1552, and among its participants was Jan Laski. Furthermore, Iwaniska had several artisans, with their guilds. It was a private town, administratively located in the Sandomierz County in the Sandomierz Voivodeship in the Lesser Poland Province. The decline of Iwaniska was marked by the Swedish invasion of Poland; in 1656 the town was plundered and completely burned by Cossacks in service of Transilvanian prince George II Rakoczi. By 1674, the population shrank to 311, and Iwaniska never recovered from the destruction.

Following the Third Partition of Poland, in 1795, Iwaniska was annexed by the Habsburg Empire. It was regained by Poles following the Austro-Polish War of 1809 and included within the short-lived Duchy of Warsaw, and after its dissolution, from 1815 to 1915, it was part of Russian-controlled Congress Poland. In 1827, it had a population of app. 1,000, with 167 houses. Iwaniska lost its town charter in 1869, after the January Uprising. In 1914, the village received a narrow gauge rail connection with Bogoria. The line was closed in 1959.

During the German occupation of Poland (World War II), the Polish resistance movement was active in the town, and Polish underground press was distributed in Iwaniska.

Iwaniska, in common with many other places throughout central Europe, was home to a vibrant Jewish community until the German occupation during World War II. The Yiddish name for Iwaniska was 'Ivansk'. Descendants of the Jewish inhabitants of 'Ivansk' operate a web site and publish a newsletter.

== Sights ==
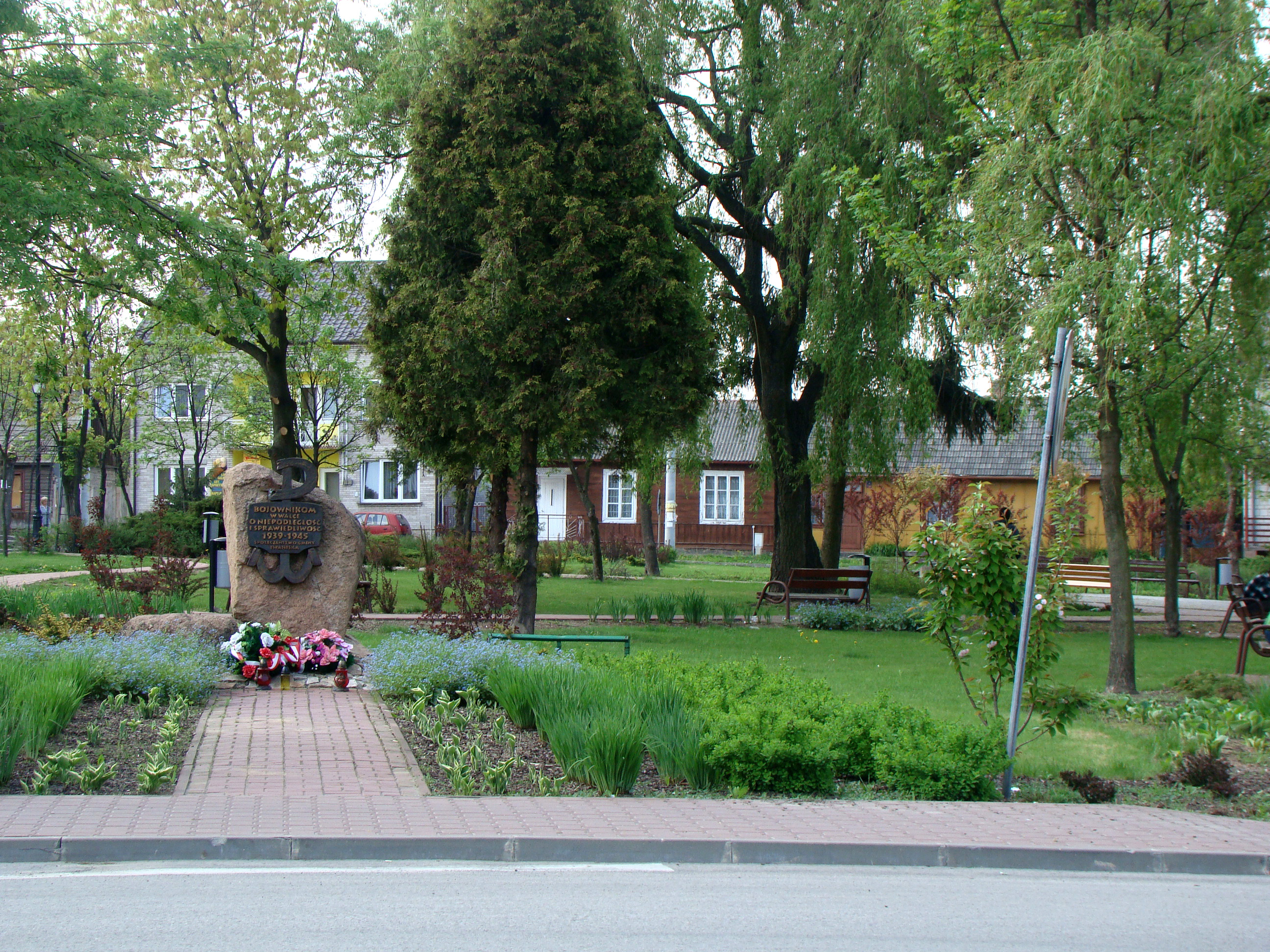
Center of Iwaniska with a World War II memorial

Among points of interest are a neo-Gothic St. Catherine church (early 20th century), standing in the location of a wooden church from 1718, which burned in 1898. Furthermore, there is an old cemetery, whose history dates back to the 15th century, as well as a World War I and World War II military cemetery.

== Transport ==
The town is a junction of two Voivodeship roads (roads of regional importance) – the 757th (Opatów – Stopnica), and the 758th, which goes to Koprzywnica.
