= Jasice =

- Village
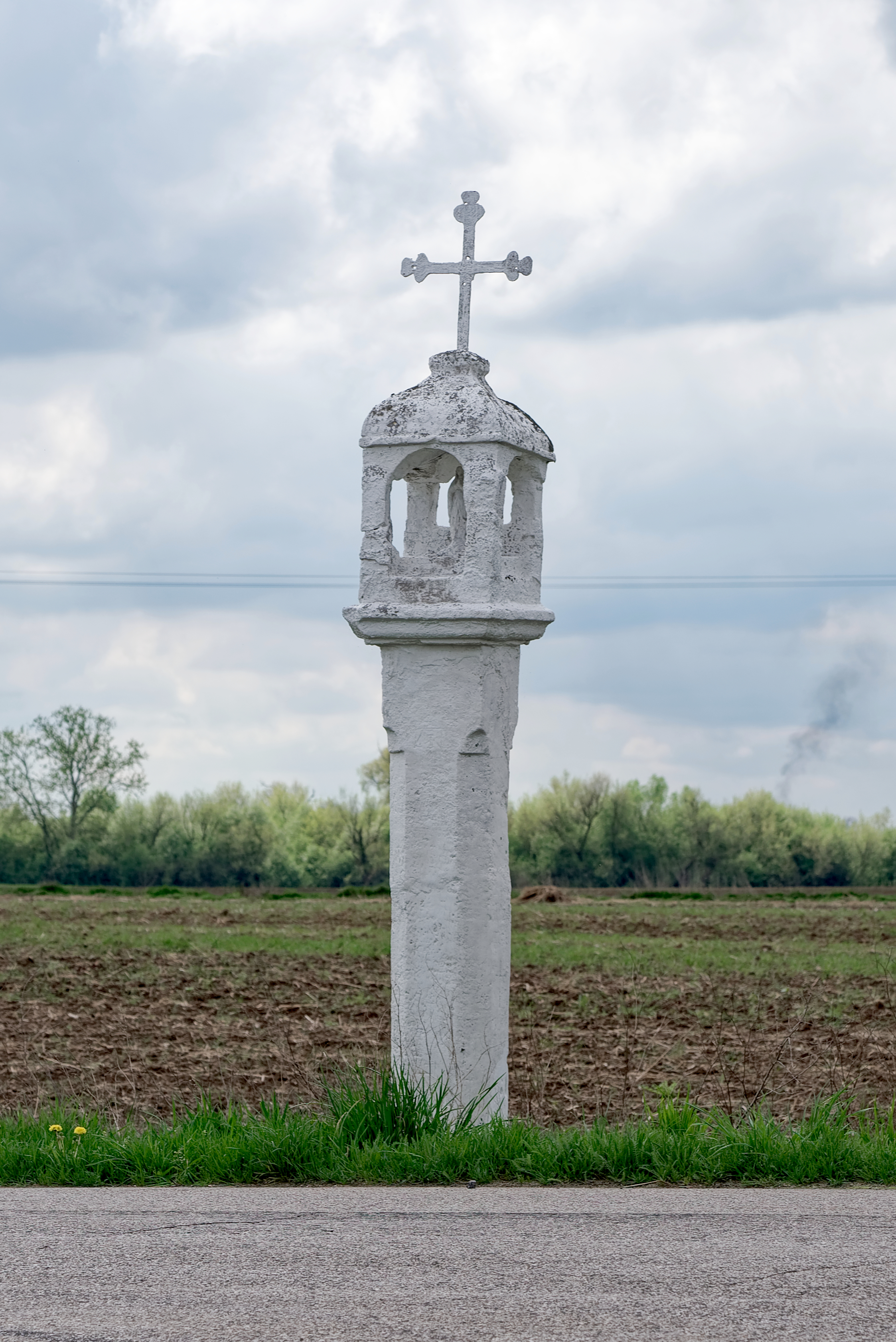

- Location within Poland
- Coordinates: 50°51′8″N 21°37′2″E
- Country: Poland
- Voivodeship: Świętokrzyskie
- County: Opatów
- Gmina: Wojciechowice
- Population: 186

Jasice [jaˈɕit͡sɛ] is a village in the administrative district of Gmina Wojciechowice, within Opatów County, Świętokrzyskie Voivodeship, in south-central Poland. It lies approximately 3 km (2 mi) east of Wojciechowice, 15 km (9 mi) east of Opatów, and 71 km (44 mi) east of the regional capital Kielce. It is completely surrounded by the area of the village of Bidziny on all sides.

== History ==
The town of Jasice was formed by Nazi Germany during World War II, due to several routing errors of trains traveling across occupied Poland. The railway station in Bidziny was renamed Jasice in order to resolve the issue. The significance of the new name lay in the fact that the station was used as point of departure for the Holocaust trains. For example, the Opatów Ghetto was liquidated entirely through the Jasice deportation to Treblinka extermination camp in the north.

Soon after the war ended, several homes built in the vicinity of the station were assigned the name of Jasice village incorrectly, rather than Bidziny, thus leading to the development of the village of Jasice which consists of the station and several close houses only. To highlight this, the local farm supplies store which is approximate 20 m from the station on the same road is located in Bidziny in addition to several nearby houses.
