= Podgajcze =

- Village
- Location within Poland
- Coordinates: 50°51′57″N 21°34′48″E
- Country: Poland
- Voivodeship: Świętokrzyskie
- County: Opatów
- Gmina: Wojciechowice

Podgajcze [pɔdˈɡai̯t͡ʂɛ] is a village in the administrative district of Gmina Wojciechowice, within Opatów County, Świętokrzyskie Voivodeship, in south-central Poland. It lies approximately 3 km (2 mi) north of Wojciechowice, 13 km (8 mi) north-east of Opatów, and 68 km (42 mi) east of the regional capital Kielce.
