= Lisów, Opatów County =

Lisów
- Village
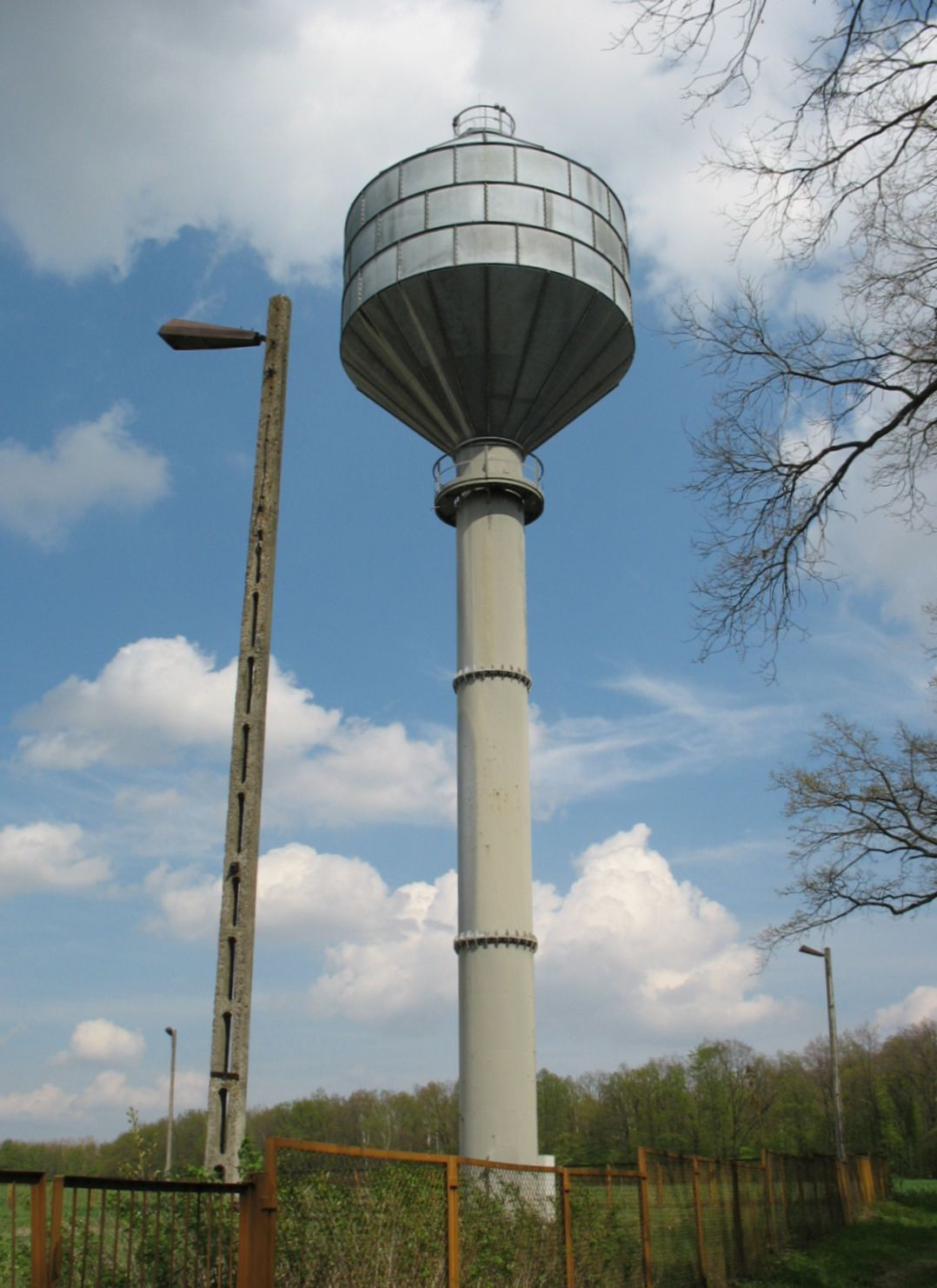

- Location within Poland
- Coordinates: 50°46′58″N 21°33′20″E
- Country: Poland
- Voivodeship: Świętokrzyskie
- County: Opatów
- Gmina: Wojciechowice
- Population: 187

Lisów [ˈlisuf] is a village in the administrative district of Gmina Wojciechowice, within Opatów County, Świętokrzyskie Voivodeship, in south-central Poland. It lies approximately 8 km (5 mi) south of Wojciechowice, 10 km (6 mi) east of Opatów, and 67 km (42 mi) east of the regional capital Kielce.
