= Orłowiny =

- Village
- Location within Poland
- Coordinates: 50°49′30″N 21°33′51″E
- Country: Poland
- Voivodeship: Świętokrzyskie
- County: Opatów
- Gmina: Wojciechowice
- Population: 88

Orłowiny [ɔrwɔˈvinɨ] is a village in the administrative district of Gmina Wojciechowice, within Opatów County, Świętokrzyskie Voivodeship, in south-central Poland. It lies approximately 3 km (2 mi) south-west of Wojciechowice, 11 km (7 mi) east of Opatów, and 67 km (42 mi) east of the regional capital Kielce.
