= Podłukawka =

- Village
- Location within Poland
- Coordinates: 50°48′41″N 21°34′1″E
- Country: Poland
- Voivodeship: Świętokrzyskie
- County: Opatów
- Gmina: Wojciechowice

Podłukawka [pɔdwuˈkafka] is a village in the administrative district of Gmina Wojciechowice, within Opatów County, Świętokrzyskie Voivodeship, in south-central Poland. It lies approximately 4 km (2 mi) south of Wojciechowice, 11 km (7 mi) east of Opatów, and 68 km (42 mi) east of the regional capital Kielce.
