= Bidziny =

- Village
- Location within Poland
- Coordinates: 50°50′27″N 21°37′41″E
- Country: Poland
- Voivodeship: Świętokrzyskie
- County: Opatów
- Gmina: Wojciechowice
- Population: 910

Bidziny [biˈd͡ʑinɨ] is a village in the administrative district of Gmina Wojciechowice, within Opatów County, Świętokrzyskie Voivodeship, in south-central Poland. It lies approximately 3 km (2 mi) east of Wojciechowice, 15 km (9 mi) east of Opatów, and 72 km (45 mi) east of the regional capital Kielce.

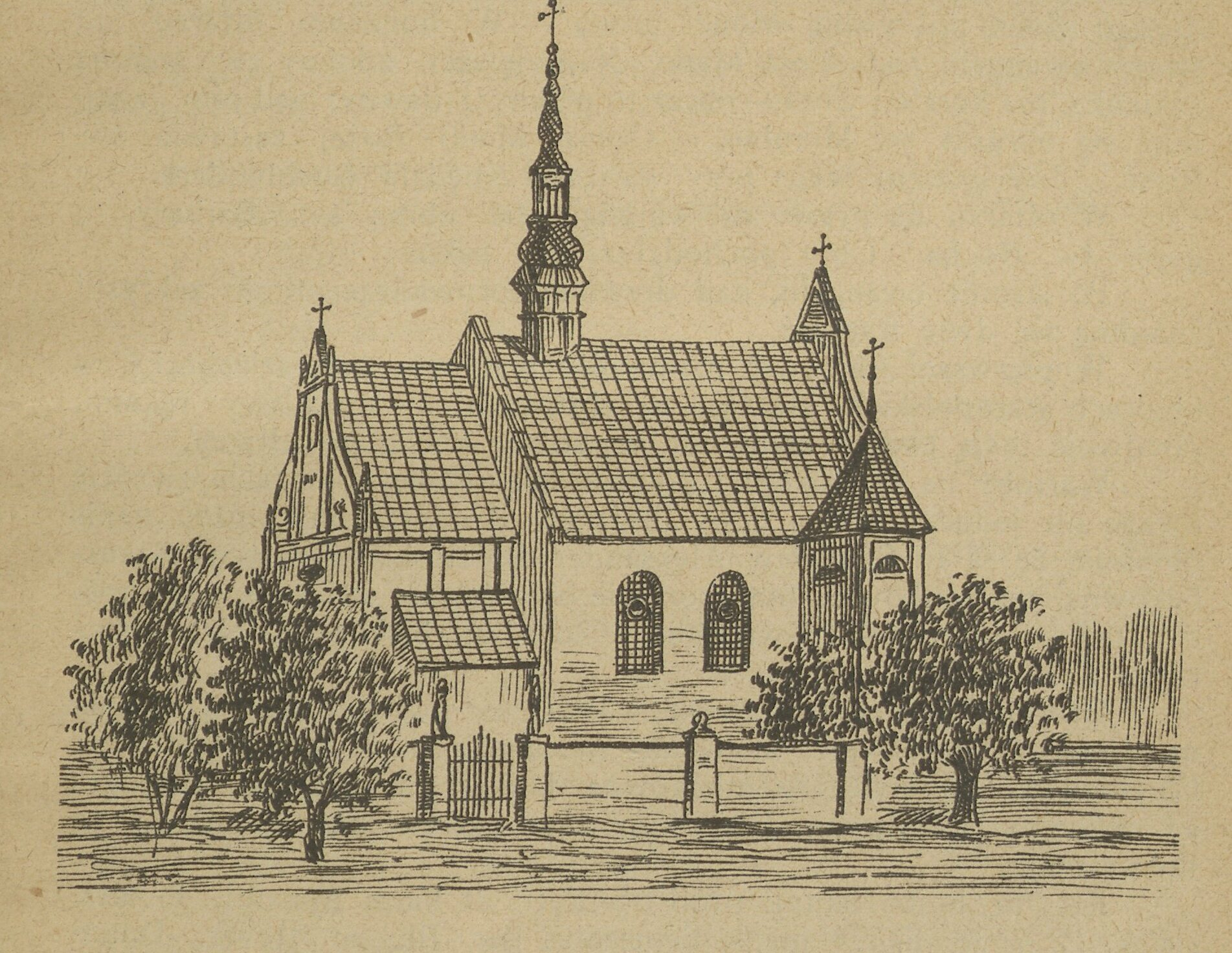
St. Peter and St. Paul's Church, before 1907
