= Podkoszyce =

- Village
- Location within Poland
- Coordinates: 50°49′22″N 21°34′57″E
- Country: Poland
- Voivodeship: Świętokrzyskie
- County: Opatów
- Gmina: Wojciechowice

Podkoszyce [pɔtkɔˈʂɨt͡sɛ] is a village in the administrative district of Gmina Wojciechowice, within Opatów County, Świętokrzyskie Voivodeship, in south-central Poland. It lies approximately 3 km (2 mi) south of Wojciechowice, 12 km (7 mi) east of Opatów, and 69 km (43 mi) east of the regional capital Kielce.
