= Stodoły =

Stodoły may refer to the following places in Poland:

- Stodoły, Kuyavian-Pomeranian Voivodeship (north-central Poland)
- Stodoły, Świętokrzyskie Voivodeship (south-central Poland)
- Stodoły, Rybnik in Silesian Voivodeship (south Poland)
