= Nowa Wieś, Opatów County =

Nowa Wieś
- Village
- Location within Poland
- Coordinates: 50°49′36″N 21°31′13″E
- Country: Poland
- Voivodeship: Świętokrzyskie
- County: Opatów
- Gmina: Wojciechowice

Nowa Wieś [ˈnɔva ˈvjɛɕ] is a village in the administrative district of Gmina Wojciechowice, within Opatów County, Świętokrzyskie Voivodeship, in south-central Poland. It lies approximately 6 km (4 mi) south-west of Wojciechowice, 8 km (5 mi) east of Opatów, and 64 km (40 mi) east of the regional capital Kielce.
