= Smugi, Świętokrzyskie Voivodeship =

Smugi
- Village
- Location within Poland
- Coordinates: 50°52′11″N 21°37′30″E
- Country: Poland
- Voivodeship: Świętokrzyskie
- County: Opatów
- Gmina: Wojciechowice
- Population: 60

Smugi [ˈsmuɡi] is a village in the administrative district of Gmina Wojciechowice, within Opatów County, Świętokrzyskie Voivodeship, in south-central Poland. It lies approximately 4 km (2 mi) north-east of Wojciechowice, 16 km (10 mi) north-east of Opatów, and 71 km (44 mi) east of the regional capital Kielce.
