= Stodoły-Kolonie =

- Village
- Location within Poland
- Coordinates: 50°49′0″N 21°35′56″E
- Country: Poland
- Voivodeship: Świętokrzyskie
- County: Opatów
- Gmina: Wojciechowice
- Population: 380

Stodoły-Kolonie [stɔˈdɔwɨ kɔˈlɔɲɛ] is a village in the administrative district of Gmina Wojciechowice, within Opatów County, Świętokrzyskie Voivodeship, in south-central Poland. It lies approximately 4 km (2 mi) south of Wojciechowice, 13 km (8 mi) east of Opatów, and 70 km (43 mi) east of the regional capital Kielce.
