= Kaliszany, Świętokrzyskie Voivodeship =

Kaliszany
- Village
- Location within Poland
- Coordinates: 50°49′53″N 21°32′2″E
- Country: Poland
- Voivodeship: Świętokrzyskie
- County: Opatów
- Gmina: Wojciechowice
- Population: 212

Kaliszany [kaliˈʂanɨ] is a village in the administrative district of Gmina Wojciechowice, within Opatów County, Świętokrzyskie Voivodeship, in south-central Poland. It lies approximately 4 km (2 mi) west of Wojciechowice, 9 km (6 mi) east of Opatów, and 65 km (40 mi) east of the regional capital Kielce.
