= Sadłowice, Świętokrzyskie Voivodeship =

Sadłowice
- Village
- Location within Poland
- Coordinates: 50°46′38″N 21°35′3″E
- Country: Poland
- Voivodeship: Świętokrzyskie
- County: Opatów
- Gmina: Wojciechowice
- Population: 201

Sadłowice [sadwɔˈvit͡sɛ] is a village in the administrative district of Gmina Wojciechowice, within Opatów County, Świętokrzyskie Voivodeship, in south-central Poland. It lies approximately 8 km (5 mi) south of Wojciechowice, 12 km (7 mi) east of Opatów, and 70 km (43 mi) east of the regional capital Kielce.
