= Wlonice, Gmina Wojciechowice =

Wlonice
- Village
- Location within Poland
- Coordinates: 50°50′5″N 21°39′25″E
- Country: Poland
- Voivodeship: Świętokrzyskie
- County: Opatów
- Gmina: Wojciechowice
- Population: 205

Wlonice [vlɔˈnit͡sɛ] is a village in the administrative district of Gmina Wojciechowice, within Opatów County, Świętokrzyskie Voivodeship, in south-central Poland. It lies approximately 6 km (4 mi) east of Wojciechowice, 17 km (11 mi) east of Opatów, and 74 km (46 mi) east of the regional capital Kielce.
