= Koszyce =

Koszyce may refer to:

- Polish name for Košice in Slovakia
- Koszyce, Świętokrzyskie Voivodeship (south-central Poland)
- Koszyce, Lesser Poland Voivodeship (south Poland)
