= Kunice, Świętokrzyskie Voivodeship =

Kunice
- Village
- Location within Poland
- Coordinates: 50°49′24″N 21°37′18″E
- Country: Poland
- Voivodeship: Świętokrzyskie
- County: Opatów
- Gmina: Wojciechowice
- Population: 200

Kunice [kuˈnit͡sɛ] is a village in the administrative district of Gmina Wojciechowice, within Opatów County, Świętokrzyskie Voivodeship, in south-central Poland. It lies approximately 4 km (2 mi) south-east of Wojciechowice, 15 km (9 mi) east of Opatów, and 71 km (44 mi) east of the regional capital Kielce.
