= Łukawka, Świętokrzyskie Voivodeship =

Łukawka
- Village
- Location within Poland
- Coordinates: 50°48′44″N 21°32′42″E
- Country: Poland
- Voivodeship: Świętokrzyskie
- County: Opatów
- Gmina: Wojciechowice
- Population: 89

Łukawka [wuˈkafka] is a village in the administrative district of Gmina Wojciechowice, within Opatów County, Świętokrzyskie Voivodeship, in south-central Poland. It lies approximately 5 km (3 mi) south-west of Wojciechowice, 9 km (6 mi) east of Opatów, and 66 km (41 mi) east of the regional capital Kielce.
