= Gierczyce, Świętokrzyskie Voivodeship =

Village in Poland

Gierczyce
- Village
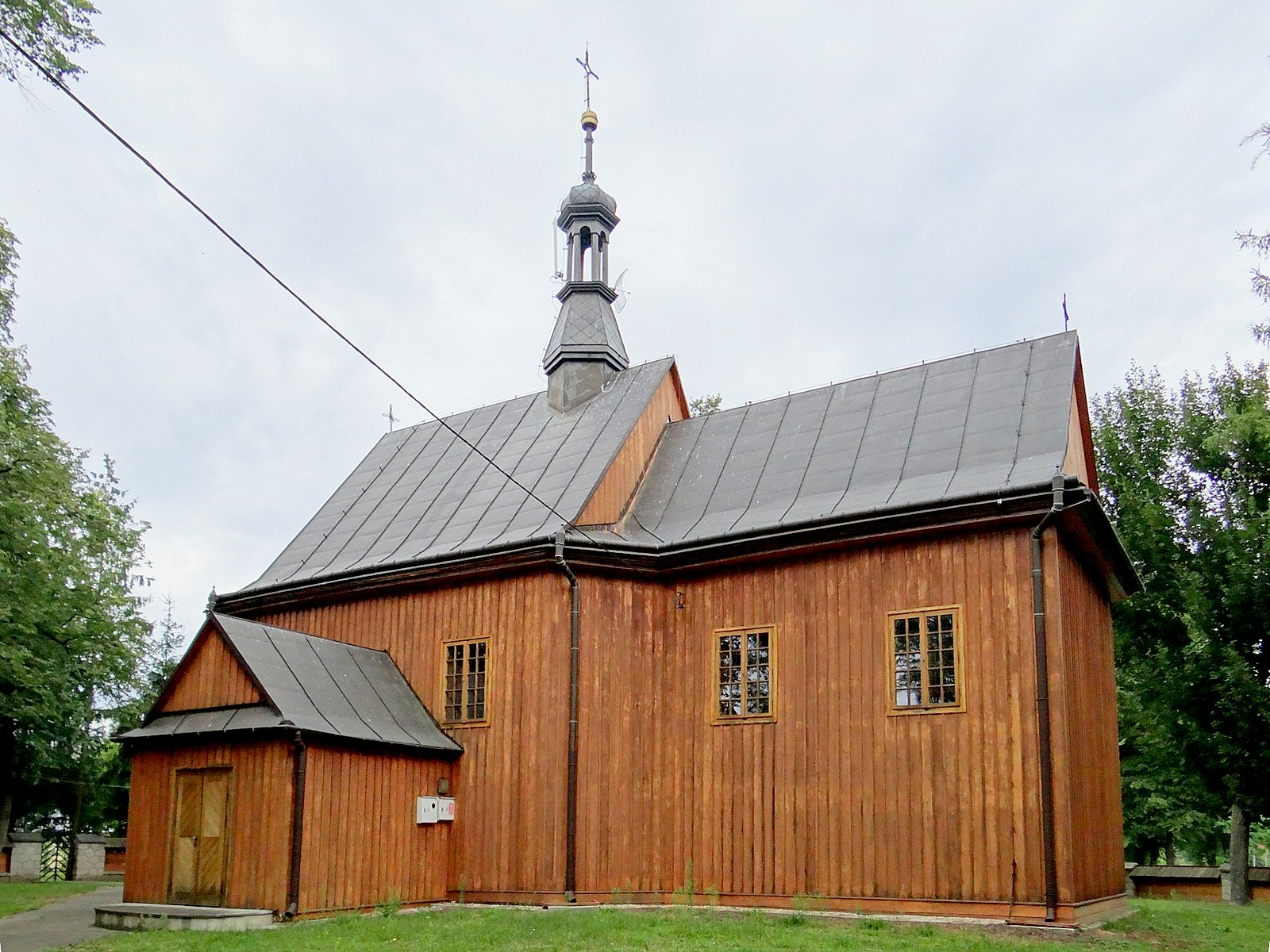
- Catholic church

- Location within Poland
- Coordinates: 50°47′35″N 21°31′18″E
- Country: Poland
- Voivodeship: Świętokrzyskie
- County: Opatów
- Gmina: Wojciechowice
- Population: 449

Gierczyce [ɡʲɛrˈt͡ʂɨt͡sɛ] is a village in the administrative district of Gmina Wojciechowice, within Opatów County, Świętokrzyskie Voivodeship, in south-central Poland. It lies approximately 8 km (5 mi) south-west of Wojciechowice, 7 km (4 mi) east of Opatów, and 65 km (40 mi) east of the regional capital Kielce.

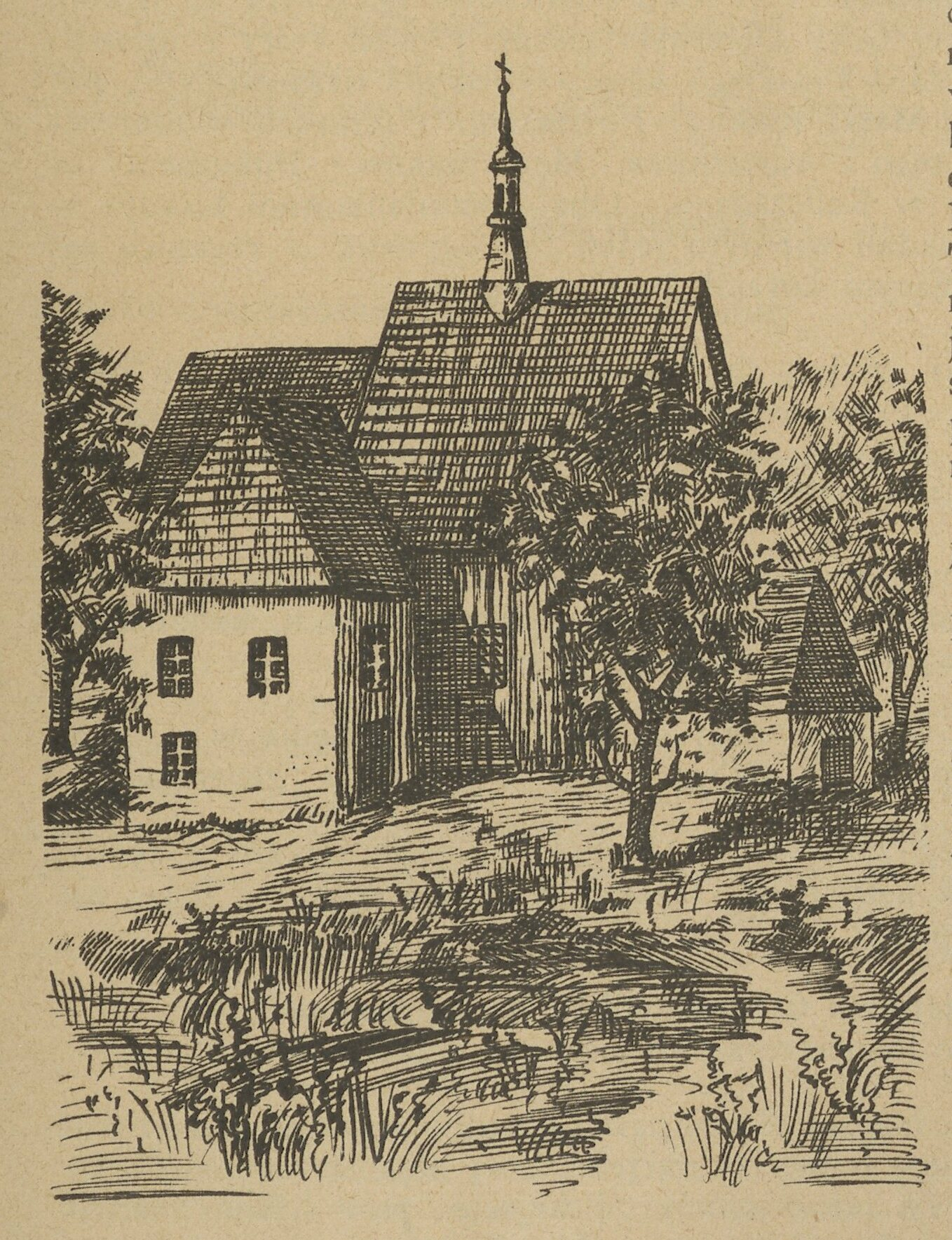
Saint Nicholas church, before 1907
