= Mierzanowice =

- Village
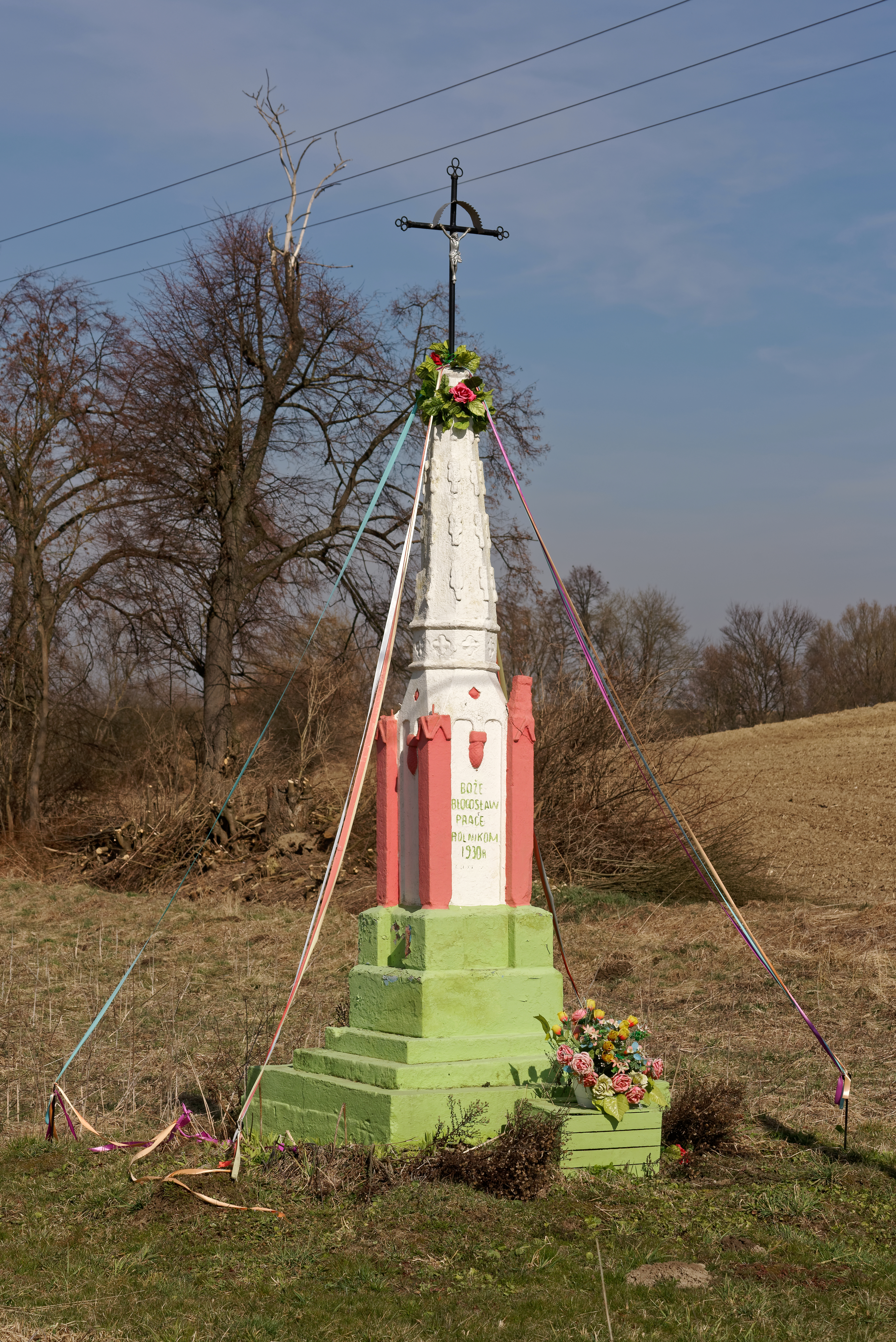

- Location within Poland
- Coordinates: 50°50′56″N 21°33′37″E
- Country: Poland
- Voivodeship: Świętokrzyskie
- County: Opatów
- Gmina: Wojciechowice
- Population: 168

Mierzanowice [mjɛʐanɔˈvit͡sɛ] is a village in the administrative district of Gmina Wojciechowice, within Opatów County, Świętokrzyskie Voivodeship, in south-central Poland. It lies approximately 2 km (1 mi) west of Wojciechowice, 11 km (7 mi) north-east of Opatów, and 67 km (42 mi) east of the regional capital Kielce.

== See also ==
- Mierzanowice culture
