= Globular Amphora culture =

Archaeological culture in Central Europe

- Geographical range: Central Europe Eastern Europe
- Period: Chalcolithic
- Dates: circa 3400 BCE – circa 2800 BCE
- Major sites: Koszyce, Świętokrzyskie Voivodeship, Złota, Sandomierz County, Kierzkowo, Kowal (town), Kuczkowo, Opatowice, Kuyavian-Pomeranian Voivodeship, Krzemionki, Klementowice
- Preceded by: Funnelbeaker culture, Lengyel culture, Cucuteni-Trypillia culture
- Followed by: Corded Ware culture, Zlota culture, Schönfeld culture,

The Globular Amphora culture (GAC, German: Kugelamphoren-Kultur (KAK); c. 3400–2800 BC, is an archaeological culture in Central Europe. Marija Gimbutas assumed an Indo-European origin, though this is contradicted by newer genetic studies that show a connection to the earlier wave of Early European Farmers rather than to Western Steppe Herders from the Ukrainian and south-western Russian steppes.

The Globular Amphora culture preceded the Corded Ware culture in its central area. Somewhat to the south and west, it was bordered by the Baden culture. To the northeast was the Narva culture. It occupied much of the same area as the earlier Funnelbeaker culture. The name was coined by Gustaf Kossinna because of the characteristic pottery, globular-shaped pots with two to four handles.

== Extent ==
The Globular Amphora culture was located in an area defined by the Elbe catchment on the west and that of the Vistula on the east, extending southwards to the middle Dniester and eastwards to reach the Dnieper. West of the Elbe, some globular amphorae are found in megalithic graves. The GAC finds in the steppe area are normally attributed to a rather late expansion between 2950 and 2350 cal. BC from a centre in Wolhynia and Podolia.

Despite several minor regional to local differences, in the GAC distribution, there are two main GAC-groups; the groups are distinguished by their networks, as recently pointed out by Johannes Müller. The eastern group (the Vistula-Podolia network) share specific pottery sub-types and the exploitation of Krzemionki silex. The western groups (the Elbe network) share a pottery with elements of other archaeological groups (such as Funnel Beaker) and the presence Neck-comb axes (German: Nackenkammäxte), a special variant of stone battle axes.

== Economy ==
The economy was based on raising a variety of livestock, pigs particularly in the earlier phase of the eastern GAC groups, in distinction to the Funnelbeaker culture's preference for cattle.

In the western groups, located in central Germany, cattle dominated the few known bone assemblages. In contrast to the Bernburg Culture, which kept their cattle locally, the GAC communities moved within a radius of 50 km to feed their cattle. Accordingly, the people were probably more mobile than those of contemporaneous archaeological groups.

A high mobility is also indicated by the settlement pattern. Settlements are sparse, and these normally just contain small clusters pits. No convincing house-plans have yet been excavated. It is suggested that some of these settlements were not year-round, or indeed may have been temporary. Some evidence, such as paired oxen burials, suggests that the GAC might have made use of cattle-drawn wagons or carts.

== Burials ==
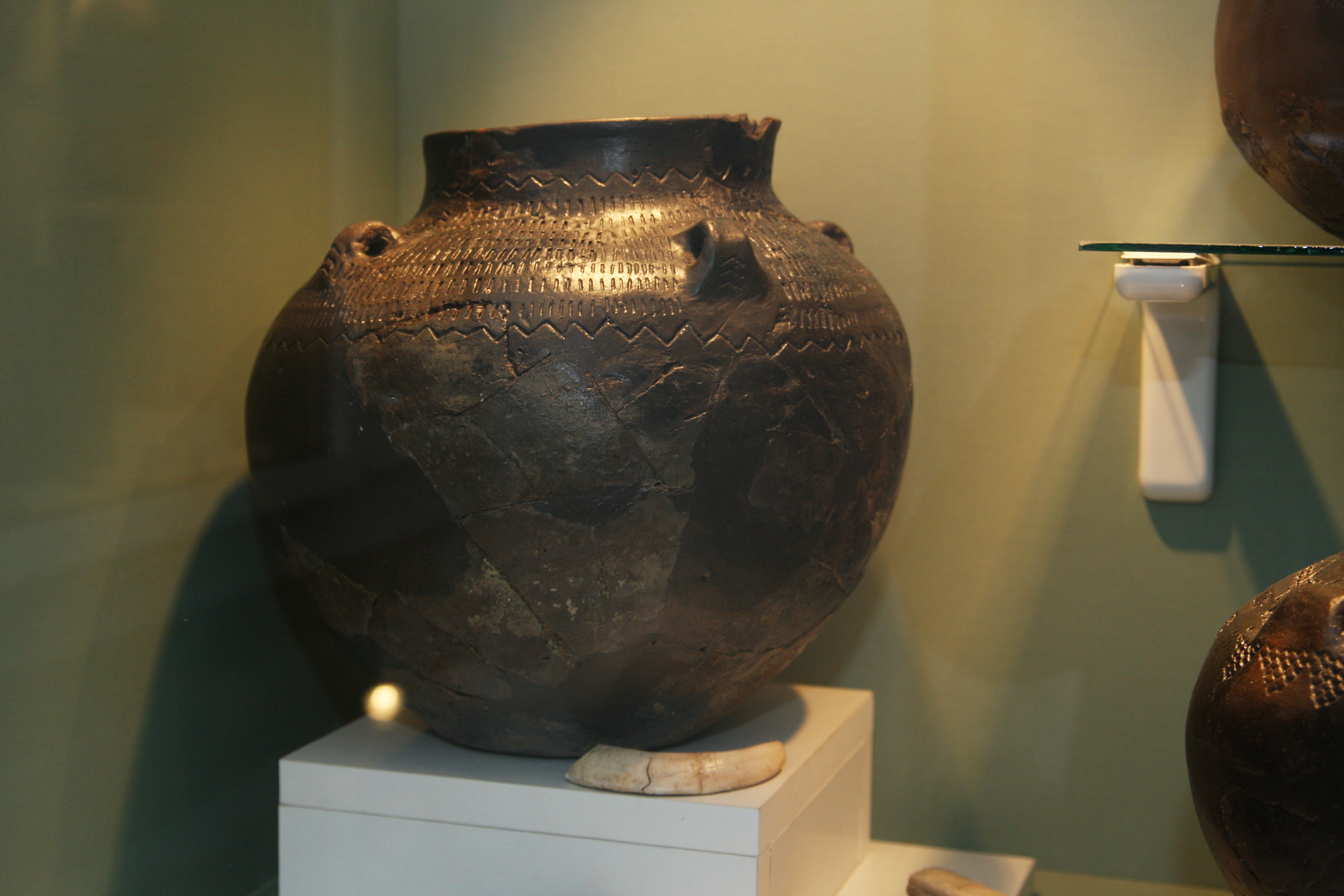
Globular Amphora

The GAC is primarily known from its burials. Inhumation was in a pit or cist. A variety of grave offerings were left, including animal parts (such as a pig's jaw) or even whole animals, e.g., oxen. Grave gifts include the typical globular amphorae and stone axes. There are also cattle-burials, often in pairs, accompanied by grave gifts. There are also secondary burials in Megalithic graves.

== Interpretation ==
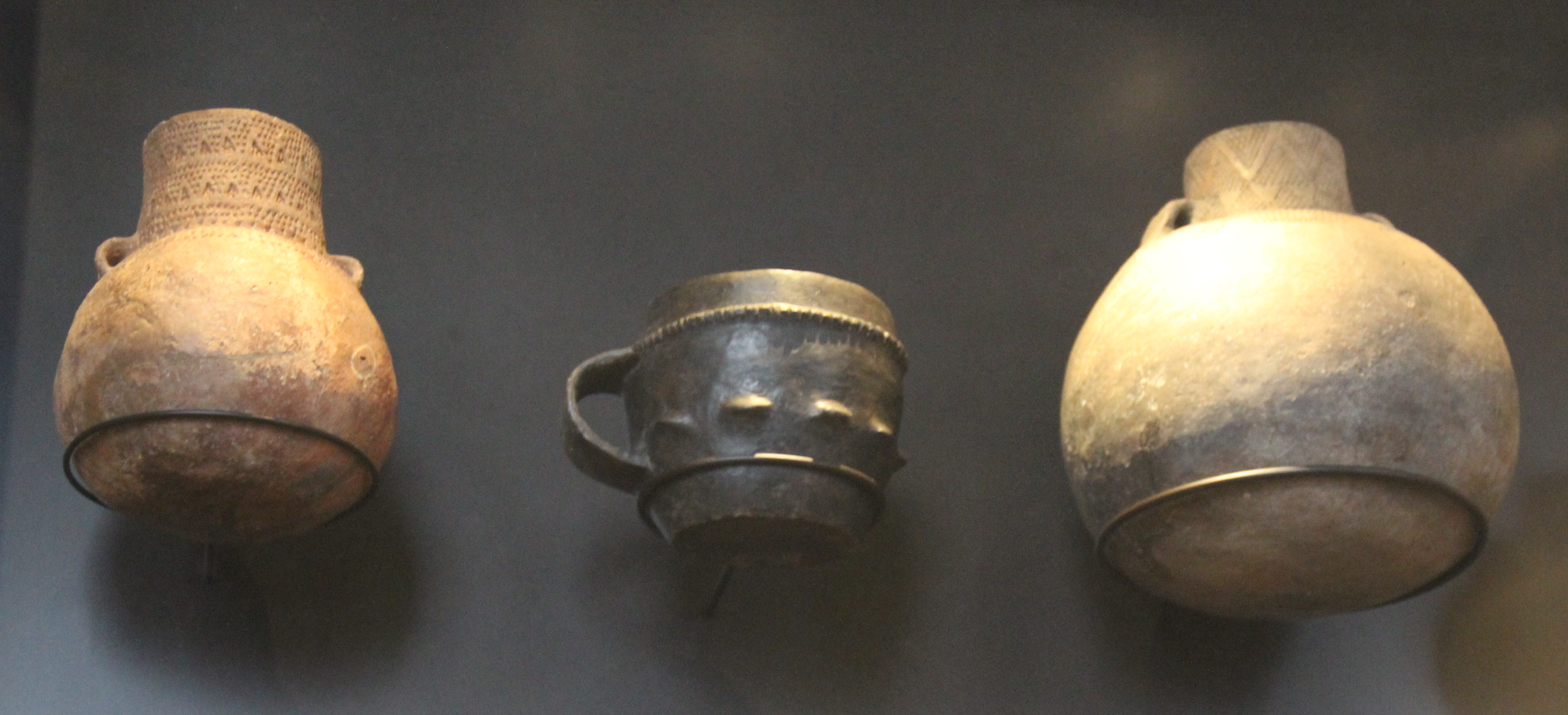
Globular Amphora pottery

The inclusion of animals in the grave is seen as an intrusive cultural element by Marija Gimbutas. The practice of suttee, hypothesized by Gimbutas is also seen as a highly intrusive cultural element. The supporters of the Kurgan hypothesis point to these distinctive burial practices and state this may represent one of the earliest migrations of Indo-Europeans into Central Europe. In this context and given its area of occupation, this culture has been claimed as the underlying culture of a Germanic-Baltic-Slavic continuum.

== Genetics ==
Tassi et al. (2017) extracted fifteen samples of mtDNA. The majority of the samples belonged to subclades of U and Haplogroup H (mtDNA), along with J, W and K. The remains were found to be closely related to Early European Farmers and Western Hunter-Gatherers, with little genetic relation to the Yamnaya culture of Western Steppe Herders in the east. The authors of the study suggested that the Globulara Amphora culture could possibly have been in contact with the Yamnaya, but that the interaction would mostly have been at the cultural level with very limited migration, if any, contrary to the predictions of Gimbutas’s Kurgan hypothesis.

Mathieson et al. (2018) included a genetic analysis of eight males of the Globular Amphora culture. Three of them carried haplogroup I2a2a1b and a subclade of it; two carried I2a2; one carried I2; one carried BT and one carried CT. According to admixture analysis they also had approximately 70% Early European Farmer ancestry and 30% Western Hunter Gatherer ancestry, some of them with negligible Eastern Hunter-Gatherer and Yamnaya traces.

Schroeder et al. (2019) examined 15 skeletons from the Koszyce mass grave in southern Poland, which is ascribed to the Globular Amphora culture. The individuals were all shown to be members of an extended family, and to have been buried with great care by someone who knew them very well. Most of them were female and children. All had been executed by a violent blow to the head, perhaps by invading Corded Ware groups. (Note: "All individuals had been brutally killed by blows to the head, but buried with great care.... From a population genetic viewpoint, the individuals are clearly distinct from neighboring Corded Ware groups because of their lack of steppe-related ancestry. Although the reason for the massacre is unknown, it is possible that it was connected with the expansion of Corded Ware groups, which may have resulted in violent conflict.") The older males of the family are missing from the grave, suggesting that they were away or had fled. Of the eight samples of Y-DNA extracted, all were found to belong to I2a-L801. The fifteen mtDNA samples consisted of various subclades of T, H, J, K, HV. The skeletons showed about 70% Early European Farmer ancestry and 30% Western Hunter Gatherer ancestry, meaning the population was distinct from neighboring Corded Ware groups in lacking steppe-related ancestry. The archaeological and genetic evidence collected from the grave indicated that the Globular Amphora culture was patrilineal, patrilocal and patriarchal and kinship-oriented, which appears to have been the norm for Late Neolithic communities in Central Europe.

Papac et al. (2021) examined 3 Globular Amphora individuals from Vlineves in the Czech Republic. They were found to harbour mainly EEF ancestry and about 25–30% WHG ancestry. The 3 Globular Amphora culture males in the study belonged to Y-haplogroup R1b–V88.

== Gallery ==
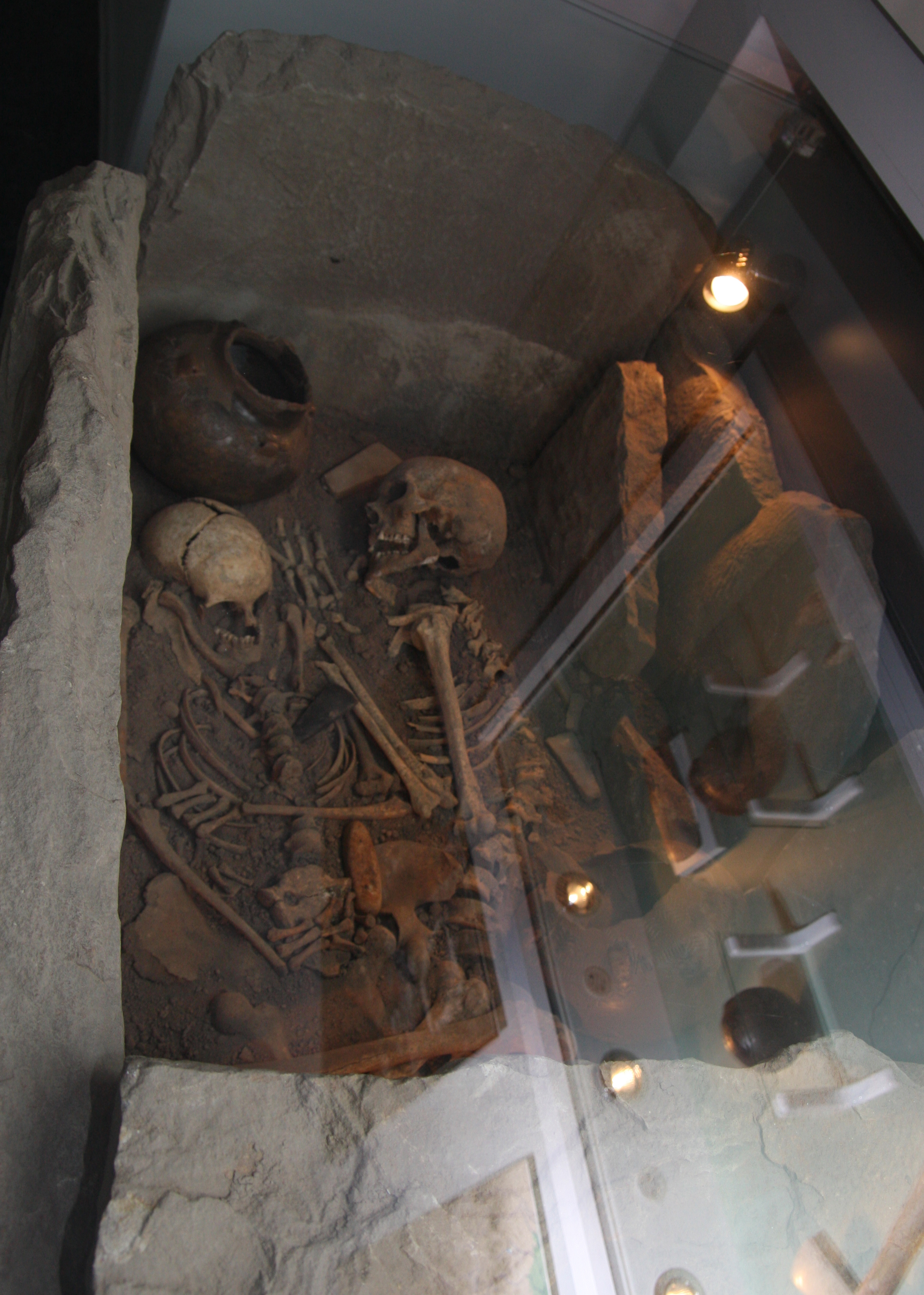
Globular Amphora tomb

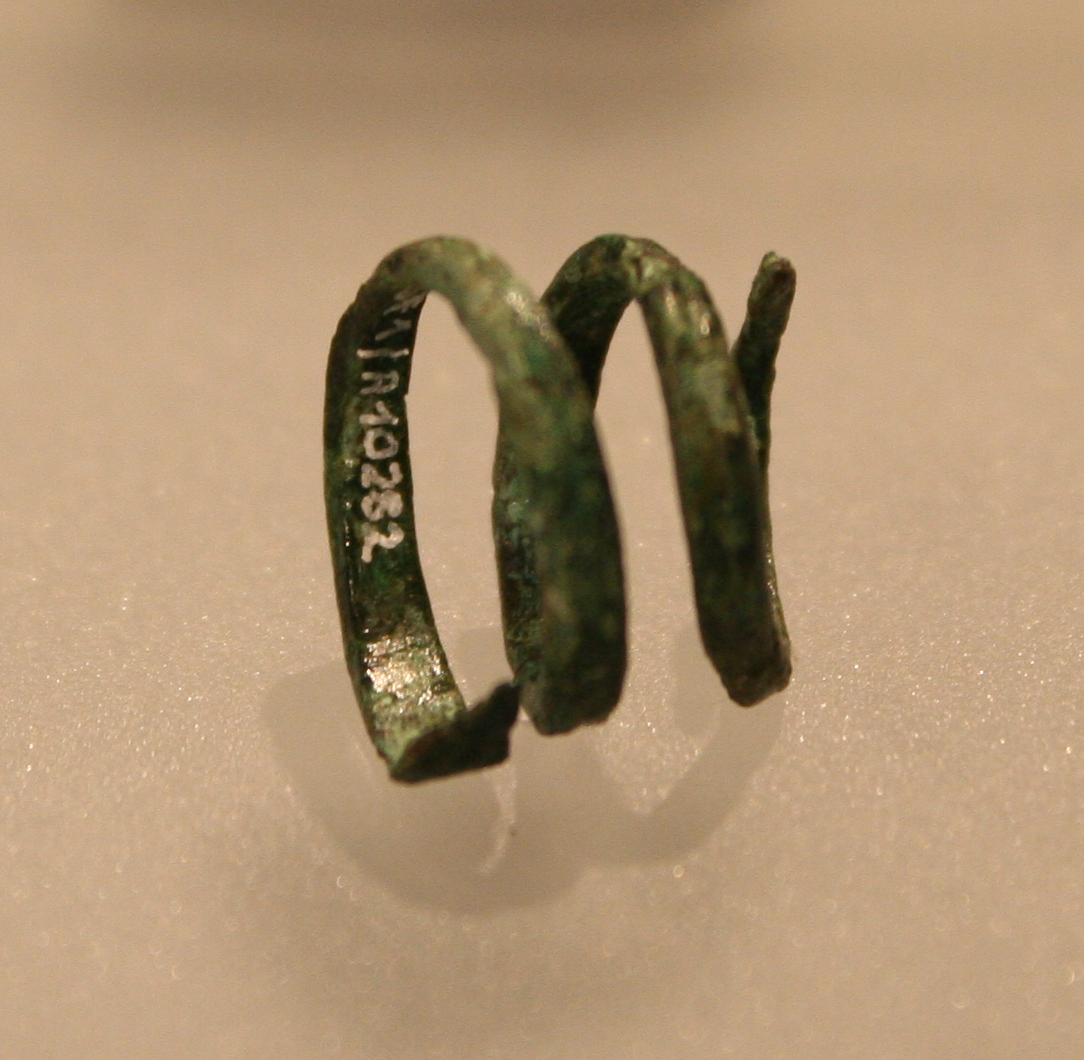
Copper ornament

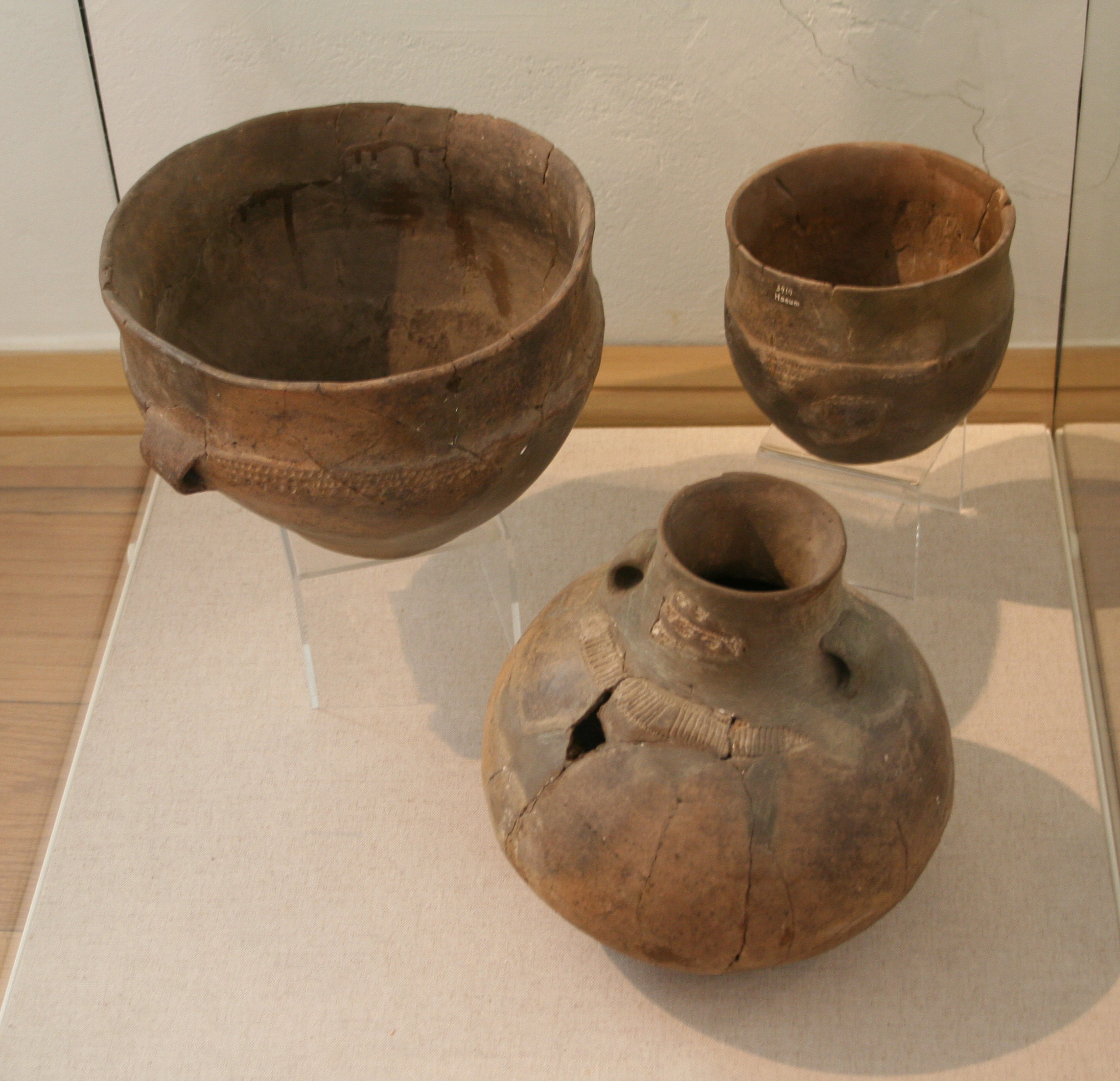
Pottery

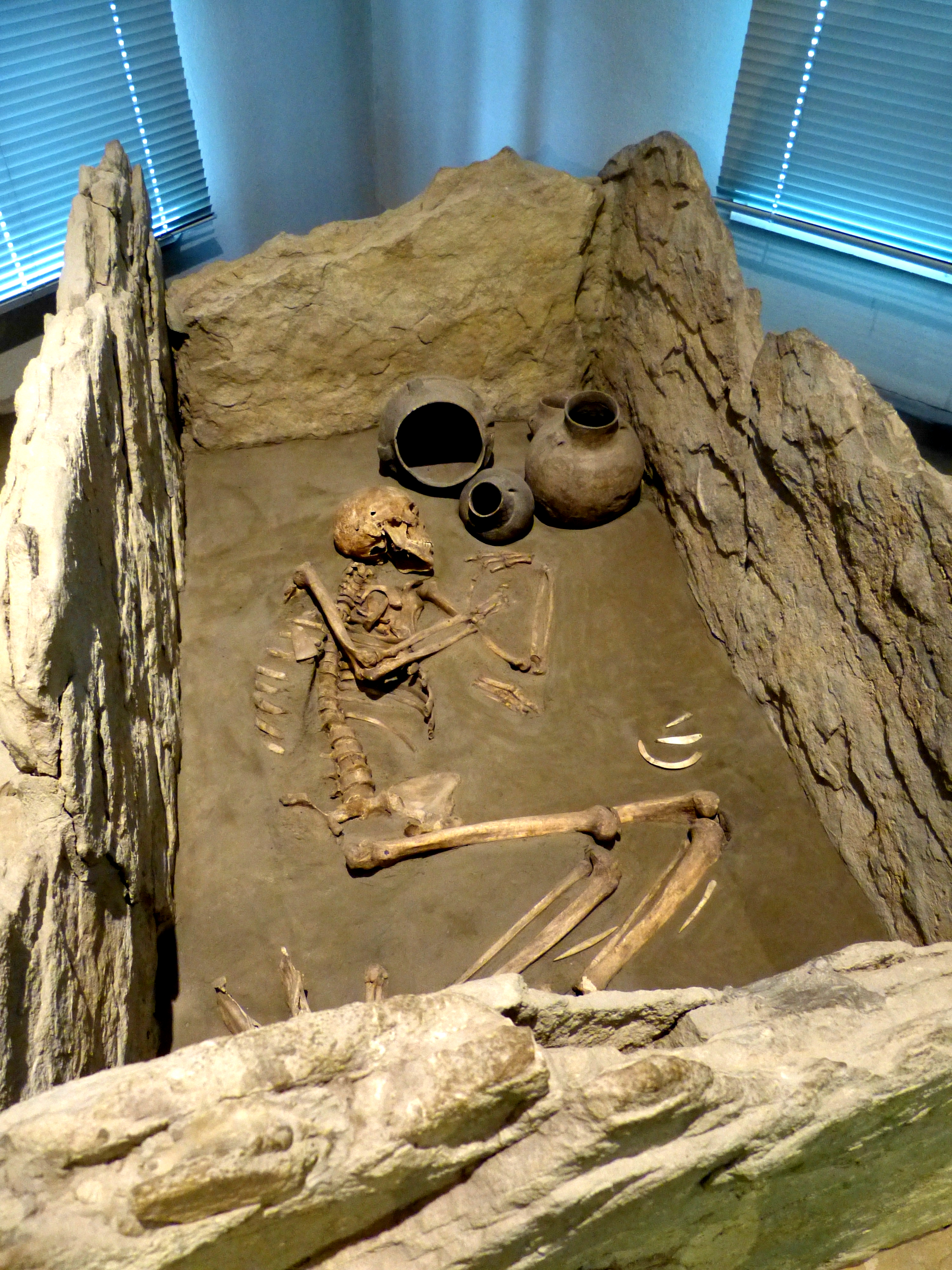
Stone cist burial

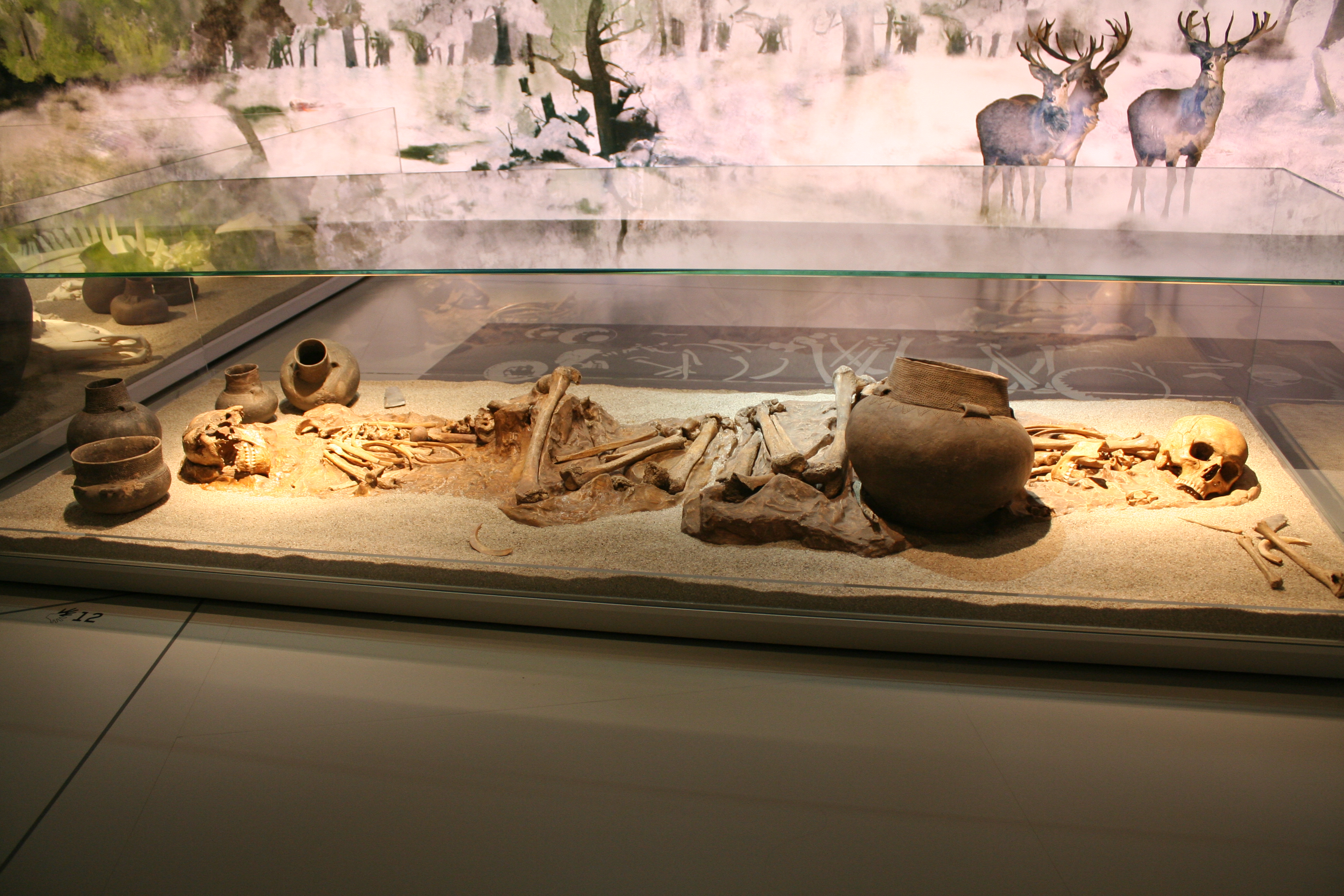
Burial

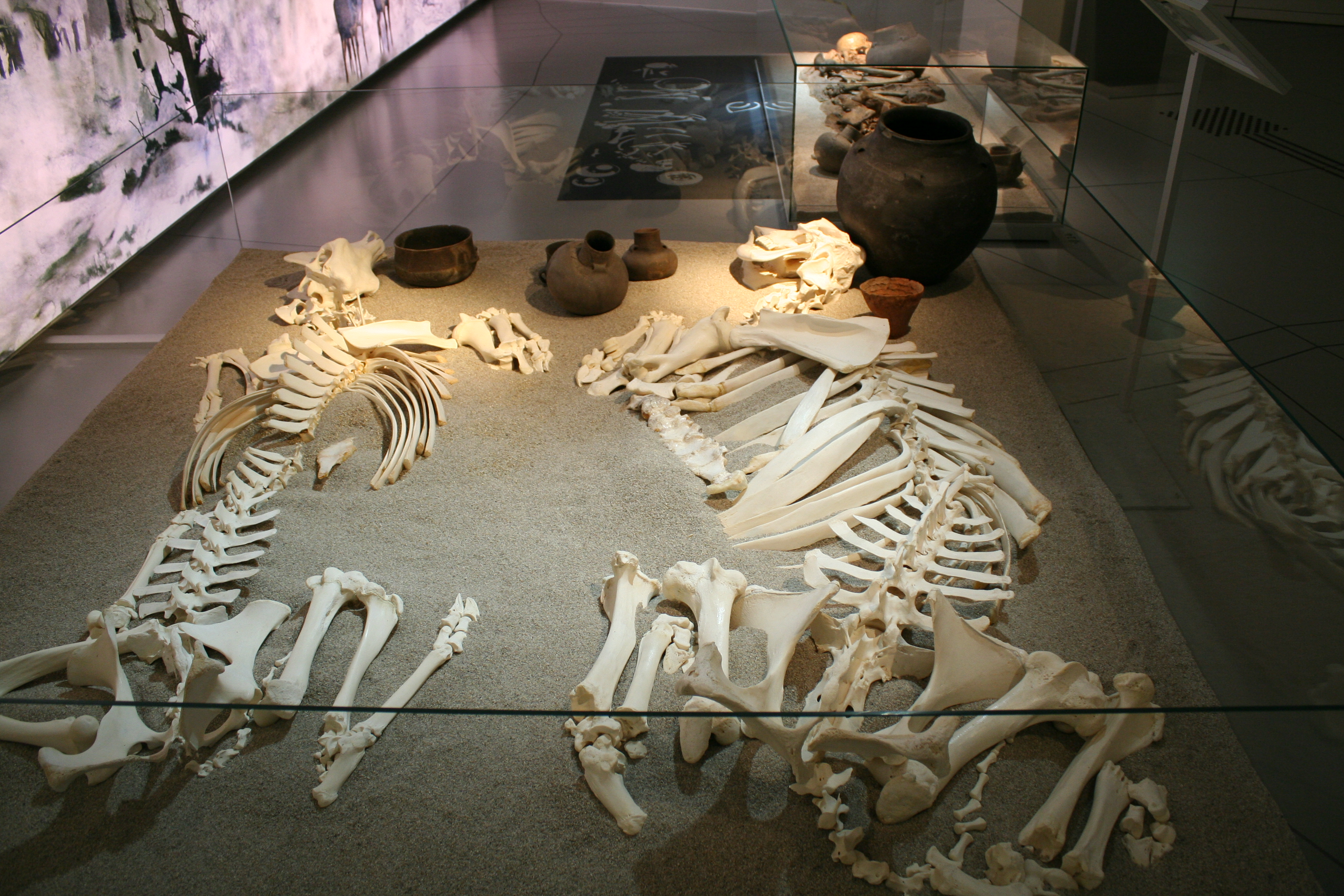
Cattle burial

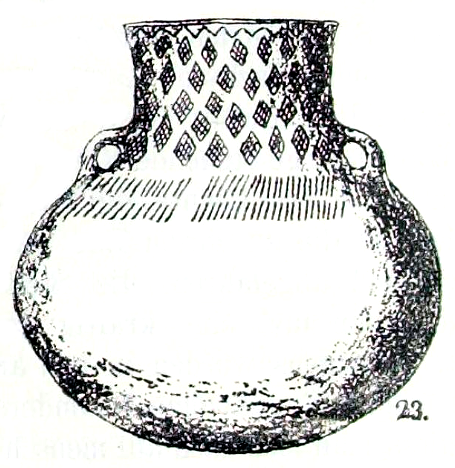
Pottery

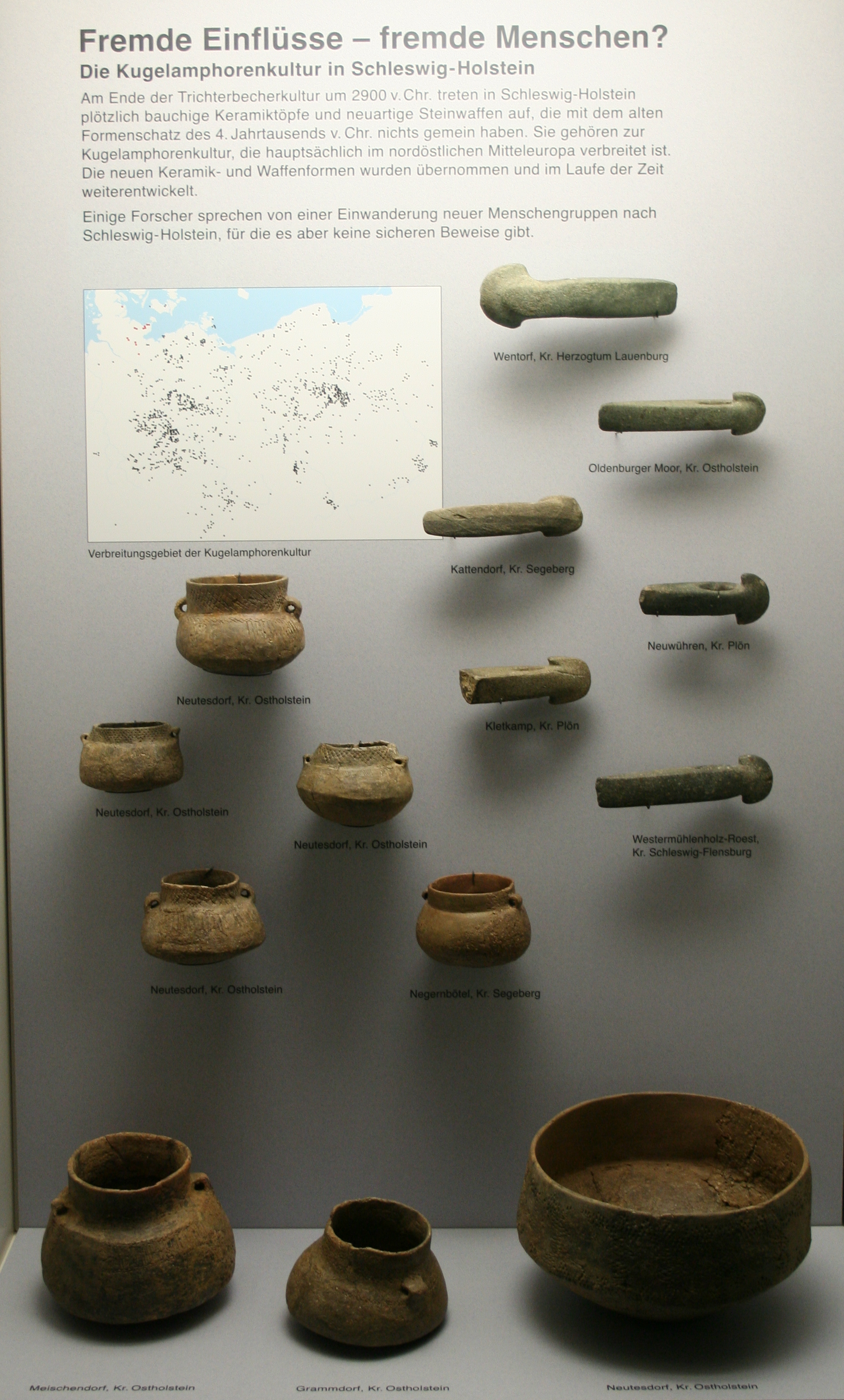
Pottery and axes

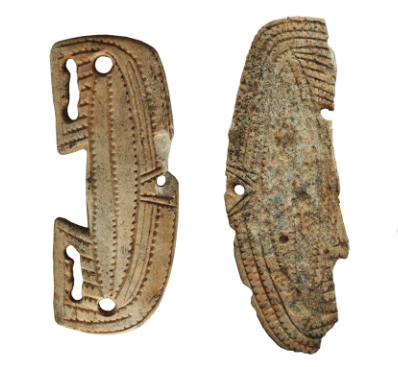
Carved bone buckles

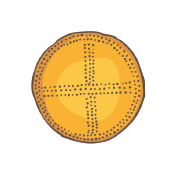
Amber disc with sun cross symbol (illustration)

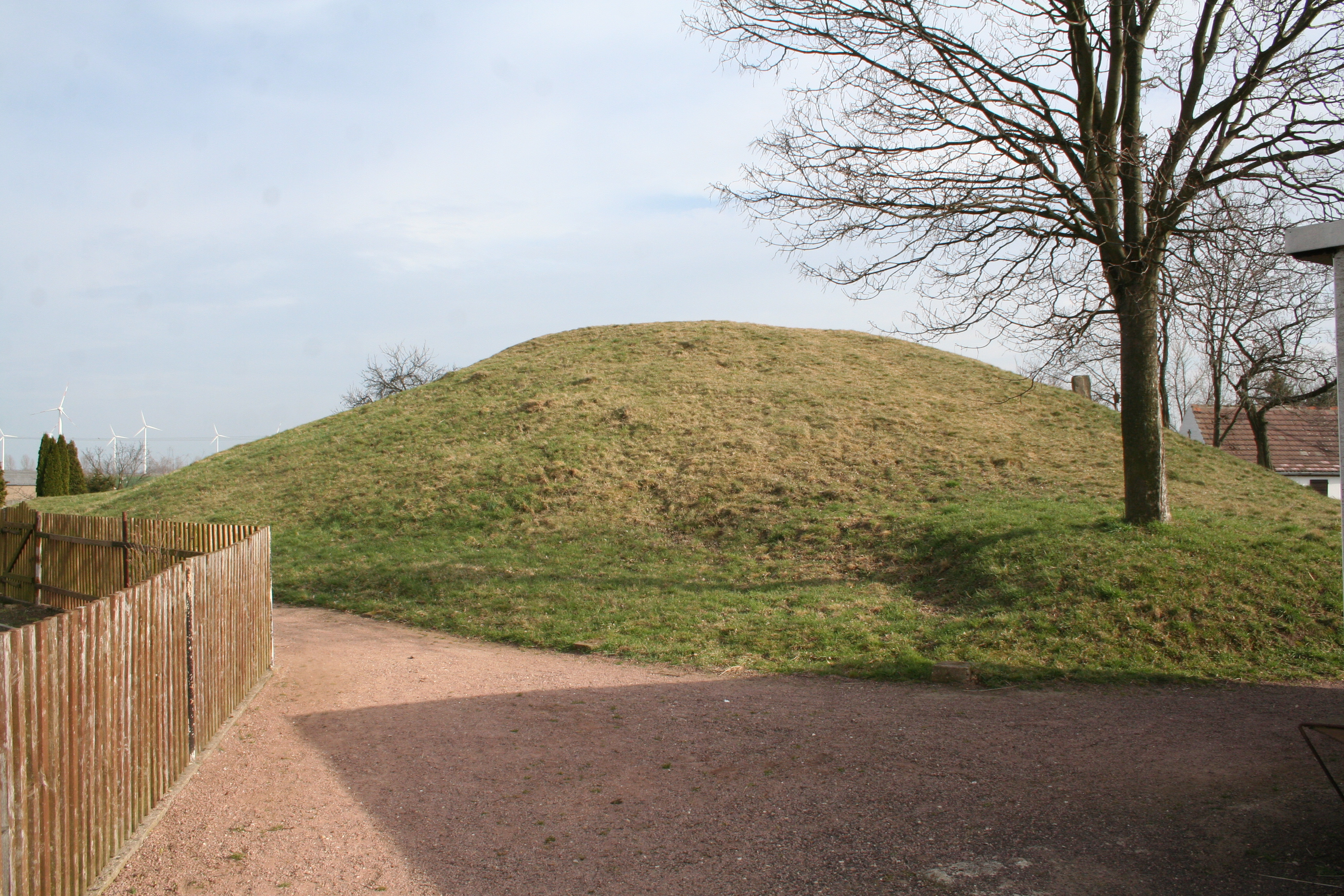
The Schneiderberg burial mound, Germany, contained burials from the Globular Amphora culture and other cultures

== See also ==
- Unetice culture
- Havelland culture

== Sources ==
- Mikhail M. Charniauski et al. (eds.), Eastern exodus of the globular amphora people: 2950–2350 BC. Poznań, Adam Mickiewicz University, Institute of Prehistory 1996, Baltic–Pontic studies 4.
- J. P. Mallory, "Globular Amphora Culture", Encyclopedia of Indo-European Culture, Fitzroy Dearborn, 1997.
- Mathieson, Iain (February 21, 2018). "The Genomic History of Southeastern Europe". Nature. 555 (7695). Nature Research: 197–203. Bibcode:2018Natur.555..197M. doi:10.1038/nature25778. PMC 6091220. PMID 29466330.
- Schroeder, H (May 28, 2019). "Unraveling ancestry, kinship, and violence in a Late Neolithic mass grave". Proceedings of the National Academy of Sciences of the United States of America. 116 (22). National Academy of Sciences: 10705–10710. Bibcode:2019PNAS..11610705S. doi:10.1073/pnas.1820210116. PMC 6561172. PMID 31061125.
- Tassi, Francesca (November 27, 2017). "The Genomic History of Southeastern Europe". Proceedings of the Royal Society B. 284 (1867). Royal Society. doi:10.1098/rspb.2017.1540. PMC 5719168. PMID 29167359.
