= Mikułowice, Opatów County =

Mikułowice
- Village
- Location within Poland
- Coordinates: 50°51′12″N 21°35′44″E
- Country: Poland
- Voivodeship: Świętokrzyskie
- County: Opatów
- Gmina: Wojciechowice
- Population: 168

Mikułowice [mikuwɔˈvit͡sɛ] is a village in the administrative district of Gmina Wojciechowice, within Opatów County, Świętokrzyskie Voivodeship, in south-central Poland. It lies approximately 2 km (1 mi) north-east of Wojciechowice, 14 km (9 mi) north-east of Opatów, and 69 km (43 mi) east of the regional capital Kielce.
