= Stodoły, Świętokrzyskie Voivodeship =

Stodoły
- Village
- Location within Poland
- Coordinates: 50°49′3″N 21°34′36″E
- Country: Poland
- Voivodeship: Świętokrzyskie
- County: Opatów
- Gmina: Wojciechowice
- Population: 390

Stodoły [stɔˈdɔwɨ] is a village in the administrative district of Gmina Wojciechowice, within Opatów County, Świętokrzyskie Voivodeship, in south-central Poland. It lies approximately 4 km (2 mi) south of Wojciechowice, 11 km (7 mi) east of Opatów, and 68 km (42 mi) east of the regional capital Kielce.
