= Koszyce, Świętokrzyskie Voivodeship =

Koszyce
- Village
- Location within Poland
- Coordinates: 50°49′54″N 21°33′59″E
- Country: Poland
- Voivodeship: Świętokrzyskie
- County: Opatów
- Gmina: Wojciechowice
- Population: 109

Koszyce [kɔˈʂɨt͡sɛ] is a village in the administrative district of Gmina Wojciechowice, within Opatów County, Świętokrzyskie Voivodeship, in south-central Poland. It lies approximately 3 km (2 mi) south-west of Wojciechowice, 11 km (7 mi) east of Opatów, and 67 km (42 mi) east of the regional capital Kielce.

In 1921, 1475 people lived here. In 1929 there was a catholic church and a synagogue. The Union of Jewish Merchants was also there.

A nearby archaeological site revealed in 2011 a mass grave of 15 victims from the late Globular Amphora culture who were murdered in the 29th century BCE. Subsequent analysis revealed that all but one were from the same extended family, and that the bodies had been carefully placed within the grave according to their family relationships.

== See also ==
- Talheim Death Pit
- Herxheim (archaeological site)
- Mass burial at Schöneck-Kilianstädten
- Mass burial at Schletz-Asparn
- Els Trocs
