= Ługi, Opatów County =

Ługi
- Village
- Location within Poland
- Coordinates: 50°52′15″N 21°36′23″E
- Country: Poland
- Voivodeship: Świętokrzyskie
- County: Opatów
- Gmina: Wojciechowice
- Population: 63

Ługi [ˈwuɡi] is a village in the administrative district of Gmina Wojciechowice, in Opatów County, Świętokrzyskie Voivodeship, south-central Poland, approximately 15 km (9 mi) north-east of Opatów, and 70 km (43 mi) east of the regional capital Kielce.
