= Gmina Wojciechowice =

Gmina Wojciechowice Wojciechowice Commune
- Gmina
- Interactive map of Gmina Wojciechowice
- Coordinates (Wojciechowice): 50°50′41″N 21°35′12″E
- Country: Poland
- Voivodeship: Świętokrzyskie
- County: Opatów
- Seat: Wojciechowice

Area
  - Total: 86.37 km^{2} (33.35 sq mi)

Population (2006)
  - Total: 4,481
  - Density: 51.88/km^{2} (134.4/sq mi)

Gmina Wojciechowice is a rural gmina (administrative district) in Opatów County, Świętokrzyskie Voivodeship, in south-central Poland. Its seat is the village of Wojciechowice, which lies approximately 13 kilometres (8 mi) east of Opatów and 69 km (43 mi) east of the regional capital Kielce.

The gmina covers an area of 86.37 square kilometres (33.3 sq mi), and as of 2006 its total population is 4,481.

== Villages ==
Gmina Wojciechowice contains the villages and settlements of Bidziny, Drygulec, Gierczyce, Jasice, Kaliszany, Koszyce, Kunice, Łany, Lisów, Łopata, Ługi, Łukawka, Mierzanowice, Mikułowice, Nowa Wieś, Orłowiny, Podgajcze, Podkoszyce, Podlisów, Podłukawka, Sadłowice, Smugi, Stodoły, Stodoły-Kolonie, Wlonice and Wojciechowice.

== Neighbouring gminas ==
Gmina Wojciechowice is bordered by the gminas of Ćmielów, Lipnik, Opatów, Ożarów and Wilczyce.
