= Opatów Ghetto =

WWII ghetto in Opatów, Poland

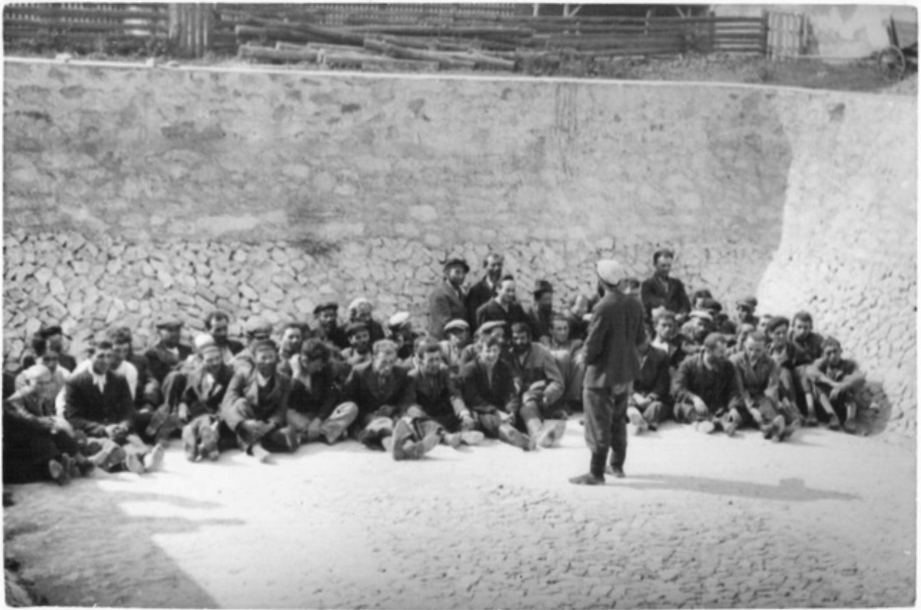
- Jewish men assembled for slave labour, Opatów, occupied Poland

- Opatów location during the Holocaust in Poland
- Location: Opatów, German-occupied Poland
- Incident type: Imprisonment, forced labor, starvation
- Organizations: Schutzstaffel (SS)
- Camp: Treblinka extermination camp
- Victims: 10,000 Polish Jews

The Opatów Ghetto was a World War II ghetto set up by Nazi Germany for the purpose of persecution and exploitation of local Jews in the town of Opatów during the German occupation of Poland. The approximate number of Jews confined to the ghetto was about ten thousand, including a group of expelees from the Czech Republic and Austria. Beginning in January 1942 the SS conducted mass shooting actions at the Jewish cemetery in Opatów where the bodies of the ghetto victims were also buried by the hundreds.

== History ==
Initially, the Opatów Ghetto, set up by Nazi Germany in 1940, was an open type ghetto, along the Joselewicza, Zatylna, Wąska and Starowałowa Streets. The newly appointed German Kreishauptman Otto Ritter ordered all Christian Poles to relocate elsewhere from the area, and formed the Judenrat in order to help designate Jews ready for work. The new Jewish Ghetto Police (Judenpolizei) were moved to the electric company building, dressed in uniforms of the Blue Police, and equipped with rubber truncheons. All stores were kept open, but food stamps were introduced to limit the distribution of regulated foods such as meat and grain. The ghetto population at the time was around 7,000 people. Expellees were brought in from smaller towns, but also from Vienna. Severe overcrowding led to steadily increasing number of deaths.

=== Ghetto liquidation ===
The ghetto was closed off from the outside officially on 13 May 1942 in preparation for its eventual dismemberment. Several months later, on 20 October 1942 in the course of Operation Reinhard, the SS with the aid of Orpo police and Trawnikis rounded up 6,500 Jewish men, women and children in the centre of town at Targowica Square. They were marched some 18 kilometres (11 mi) to the railway stop in Jasice in a one-kilometer-long column. The weakest furthest in the rear were beaten and shot by the dozen. The ghetto inmates were loaded onto the Holocaust train in Jasice, with 120 people in each boxcar fitted only with a bucket latrine. The trip of less than 300 km took three days. During this time, they received no food or water. Those who managed to survive the transport to Treblinka extermination camp, died in its gas chambers shortly after arrival.

Only one person from the Opatów trainset is known to have escaped death at Treblinka. Samuel Willenberg, 19 years old at the time, was spared by the SS and assigned to the Jewish Sonderkommando unit at the Camp 2 Auffanglager for the next several months. On August 2, 1943, Willenberg participated in the revolt at Treblinka. He was among about 200-300 prisoners who crossed the camp perimeter, chased by the SS in cars and on horses. Half of the Jews were caught and killed. Willenberg was one of about seventy insurgents who survived to the end of the war.

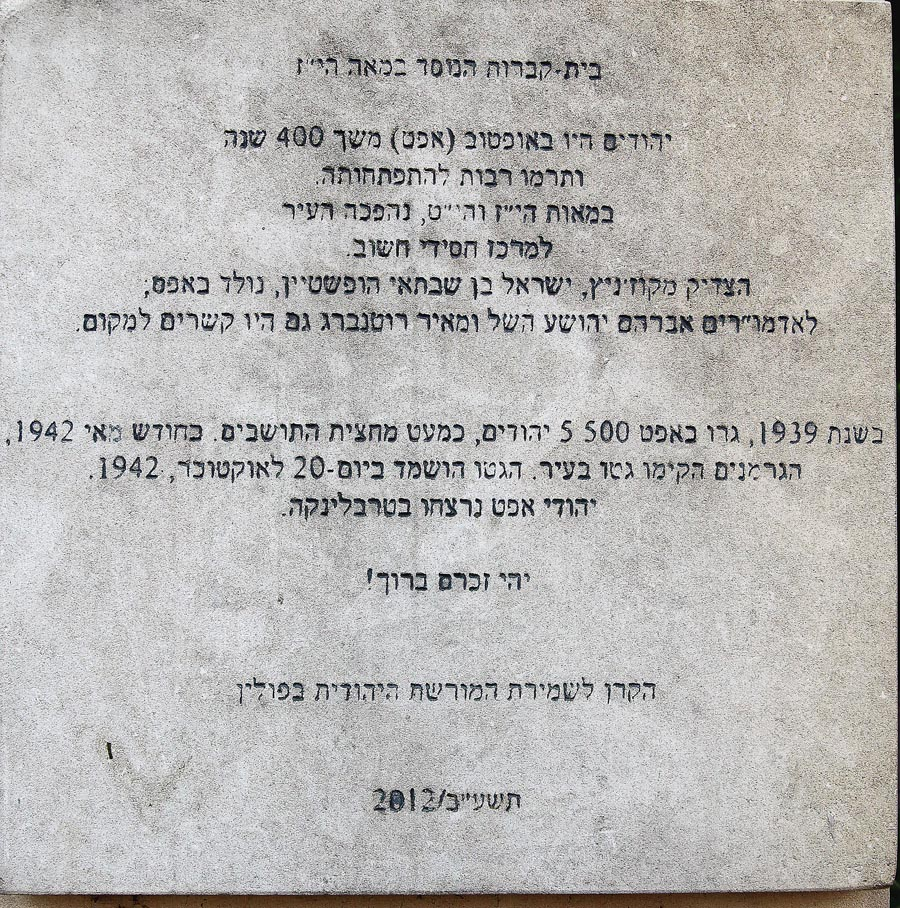
Plaque commemorating Opatow ghetto, 1939-1942

After the deportation to Treblinka, about 2,000 slave labour prisoners remained as workers for Oemler GmbH. They were sent to other labour camps in 1943–44 including in Sandomierz, Starachowice and Radom, never to return. Some were sent to HASAG in Skarżysko-Kamienna (the total of 35,000 Jews perished at the HASAG camp before the war's end). Thus, the community was entirely eradicated. The German authorities in the town organized a fire sale of everything left behind in the abandoned ghetto. Impoverished Polish families took blankets, pillows and winter clothing to survive.

Opatów was taken over by the Red Army on 16 January 1945. Only about 300 Jews are known to have survived. Among the Jews rescued in Opatów was the fourteen-year-old Rina Szydłowska, hidden for almost two years by Maria Zaleska, the Polish Righteous among the Nations recognized by Yad Vashem in 1987; as well as Israel and Franciszka Rubinek, rescued by Zofia Bania and her family, honoured posthumously in 2011.

According to the local census, 50 Jews returned to Opatów after the war. Faced with aggressive behavior in the city, the returnees started emigrating; eventually, only one Jew remained.

== See also ==
- Jewish ghettos in German-occupied Poland
- Timeline of Treblinka
