= Kierzkowo =

Kierzkowo may refer to the following places:

- Kierzkowo, Greater Poland Voivodeship (west-central Poland)
- Kierzkowo, Kuyavian-Pomeranian Voivodeship (north-central Poland)
- Kierzkowo, Gdańsk County in Pomeranian Voivodeship (north Poland)
- Kierzkowo, Wejherowo County in Pomeranian Voivodeship (north Poland)
- Kierzkowo, Koszalin County in West Pomeranian Voivodeship (north-west Poland)
- Kierzkowo, Szczecinek County in West Pomeranian Voivodeship (north-west Poland)
