= Wojciechowice, Opatów County =

Wojciechowice
- Village
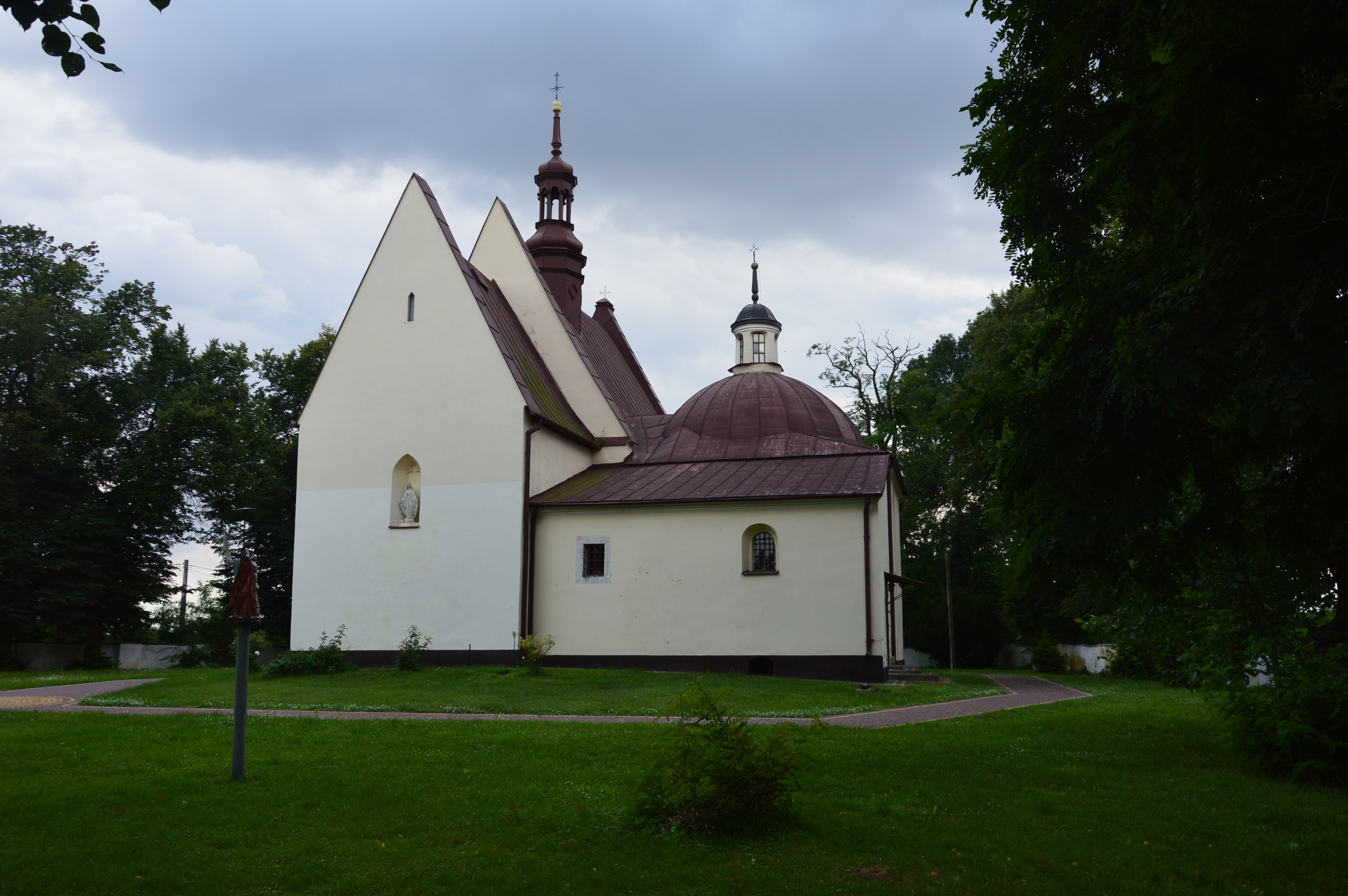
- Catholic church

- Location within Poland
- Coordinates: 50°50′41″N 21°35′12″E
- Country: Poland
- Voivodeship: Świętokrzyskie
- County: Opatów
- Gmina: Wojciechowice
- Population: 324
- Website: http://www.wojciechowice.com.pl

Wojciechowice (Polish pronunciation: [vɔjt͡ɕɛxɔˈvit͡sɛ]) is a village in Opatów County, Świętokrzyskie Voivodeship, in south-central Poland. It is the seat of the gmina (administrative district) called Gmina Wojciechowice. It lies approximately 13 km (8 mi) east of Opatów and 69 km (43 mi) east of the regional capital Kielce.
