= Tychów Stary =

- Village
- Location within Poland
- Coordinates: 51°7′25″N 21°5′37″E
- Country: Poland
- Voivodeship: Świętokrzyskie
- County: Starachowice
- Gmina: Mirzec
- Population: 783

Tychów Stary [ˈtɨxuf ˈstarɨ] is a village in the administrative district of Gmina Mirzec, within Starachowice County, Świętokrzyskie Voivodeship, in south-central Poland. It lies approximately 3 km (2 mi) south-east of Mirzec, 9 km (6 mi) north of Starachowice, and 43 km (27 mi) north-east of the regional capital Kielce.

The village had a population of 783 in 2021
