= Zbrza, Starachowice County =

Zbrza
- City
- Location within Poland
- Coordinates: 50°56′37″N 21°8′12″E
- Country: Poland
- Voivodeship: Świętokrzyskie
- County: Starachowice
- Gmina: Pawłów
- Population: 80

Zbrza [zbʐa] is a village in the administrative district of Gmina Pawłów, within Starachowice County, Świętokrzyskie Voivodeship, in south-central Poland. It lies approximately 4 km (2 mi) south-east of Pawłów, 13 km (8 mi) south-east of Starachowice, and 38 km (24 mi) east of the regional capital Kielce.
