= Gadka, Świętokrzyskie Voivodeship =

Gadka
- Village
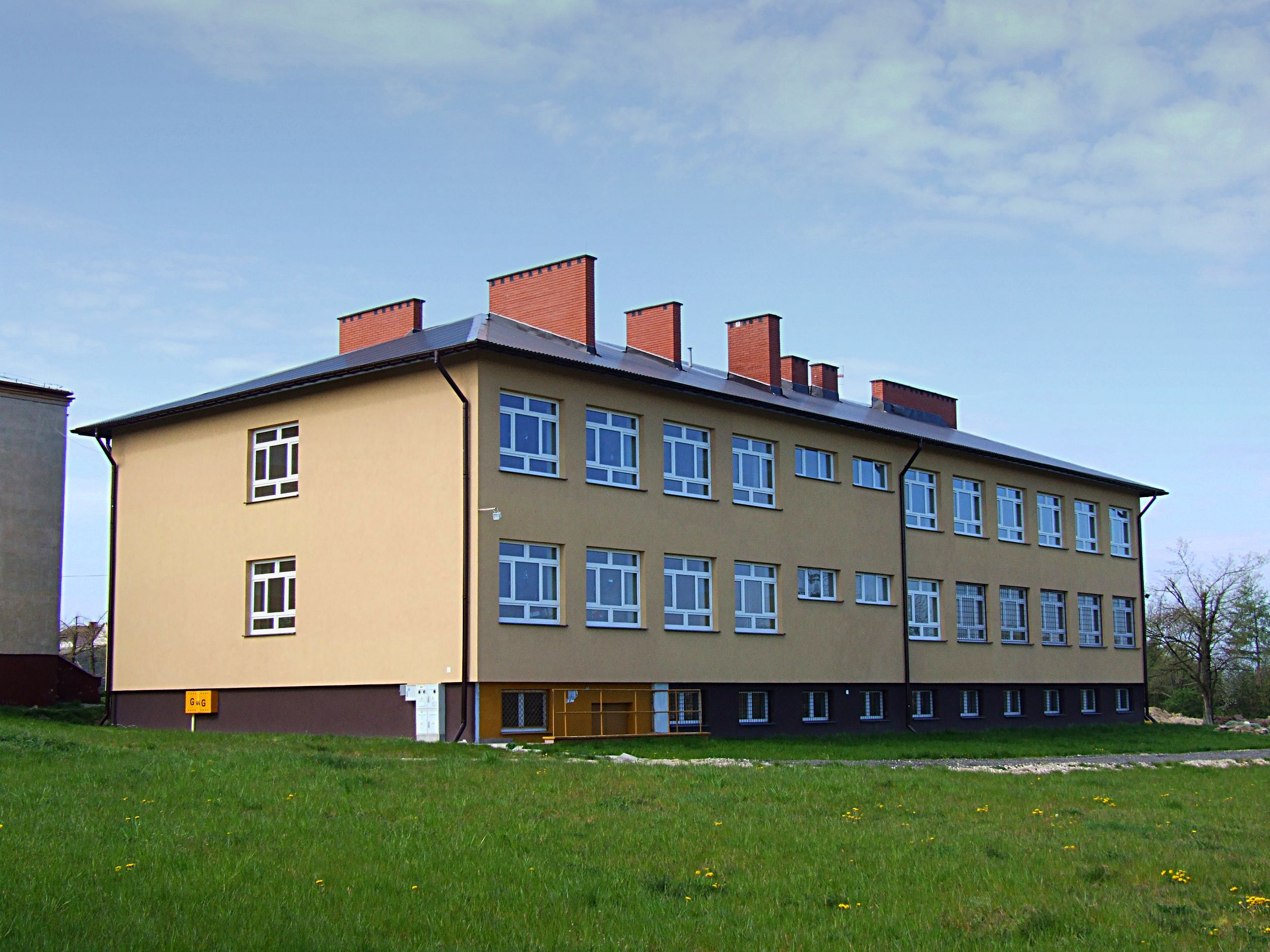
- School

- Location within Poland
- Coordinates: 51°8′4″N 21°0′26″E
- Country: Poland
- Voivodeship: Świętokrzyskie
- County: Starachowice
- Gmina: Mirzec
- Population: 1,300

Gadka (Polish pronunciation: [ˈɡatka]) is a village in the administrative district of Gmina Mirzec, within Starachowice County, Świętokrzyskie Voivodeship, in south-central Poland. It lies approximately 4 km (2 mi) west of Mirzec, 11 km (7 mi) north-west of Starachowice, and 40 km (25 mi) north-east of the regional capital Kielce.
