= Szeligi, Świętokrzyskie Voivodeship =

Szeligi
- Village
- Location within Poland
- Coordinates: 50°56′53″N 21°10′48″E
- Country: Poland
- Voivodeship: Świętokrzyskie
- County: Starachowice
- Gmina: Pawłów
- Population: 190

Szeligi [ʂɛˈliɡi] is a village in the administrative district of Gmina Pawłów, within Starachowice County, Świętokrzyskie Voivodeship, in south-central Poland. It lies approximately 6 km (4 mi) east of Pawłów, 14 km (9 mi) south-east of Starachowice, and 41 km (25 mi) east of the regional capital Kielce.
