= Krupów =

- Village
- Location within Poland
- Coordinates: 51°10′16″N 21°5′30″E
- Country: Poland
- Voivodeship: Świętokrzyskie
- County: Starachowice
- Gmina: Mirzec
- Population: 110

Krupów [ˈkrupuf] is a village in the administrative district of Gmina Mirzec, within Starachowice County, Świętokrzyskie Voivodeship, in south-central Poland. It lies approximately 5 km (3 mi) north-east of Mirzec, 14 km (9 mi) north of Starachowice, and 47 km (29 mi) north-east of the regional capital Kielce.
