= Pokrzywnica, Starachowice County =

Pokrzywnica
- Village
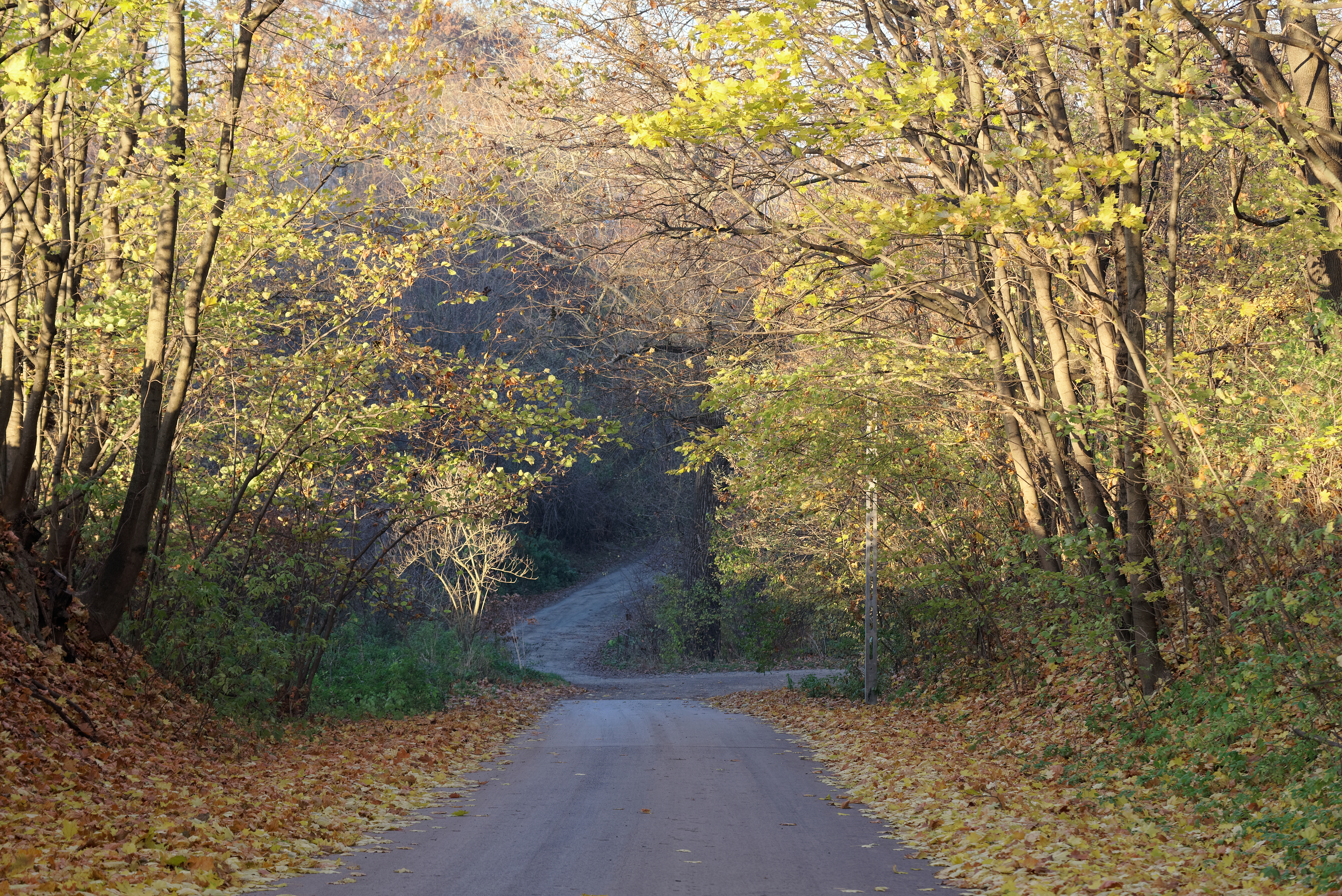

- Location within Poland
- Coordinates: 50°55′44″N 21°8′45″E
- Country: Poland
- Voivodeship: Świętokrzyskie
- County: Starachowice
- Gmina: Pawłów
- Population: 350

Pokrzywnica [pɔkʂɨvˈnit͡sa] is a village in the administrative district of Gmina Pawłów, within Starachowice County, Świętokrzyskie Voivodeship, in south-central Poland. It lies approximately 5 km (3 mi) south-east of Pawłów, 15 km (9 mi) south of Starachowice, and 38 km (24 mi) east of the regional capital Kielce.
