= Tarczek =

- Village
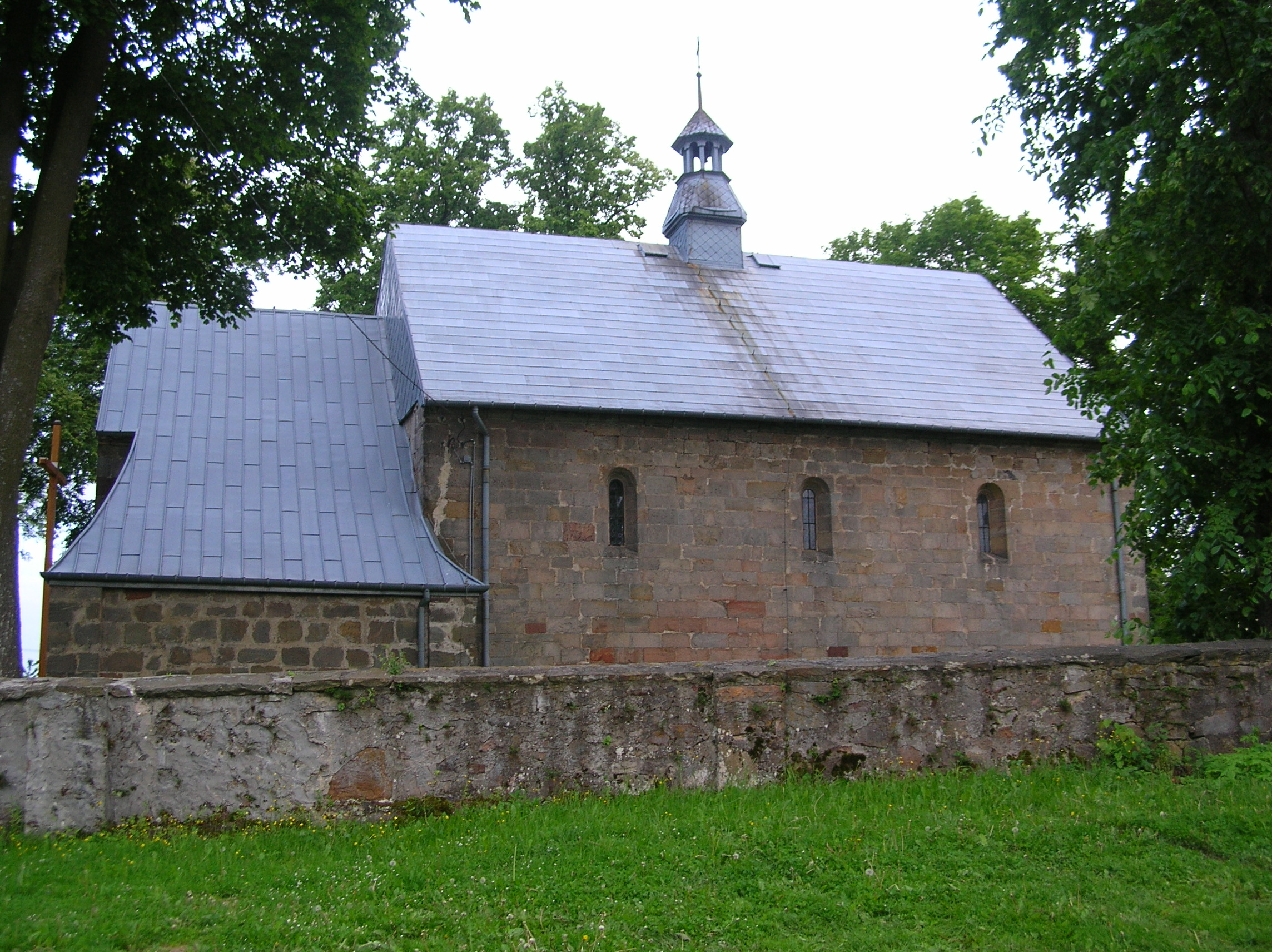
- Church from the 13th century in Tarczek

- Location within Poland
- Coordinates: 50°56′35″N 21°0′12″E
- Country: Poland
- Voivodeship: Świętokrzyskie
- County: Starachowice
- Gmina: Pawłów
- Population: 590

Tarczek [ˈtart͡ʂɛk] is a village in the administrative district of Gmina Pawłów, within Starachowice County, Świętokrzyskie Voivodeship, in south-central Poland. It lies approximately 8 km (5 mi) west of Pawłów, 13 km (8 mi) south of Starachowice, and 28 km (17 mi) east of the regional capital Kielce.

Tarczek lies on the Psarka river, among the hills of Gory Swietokrzyskie, north of Lysogory. The village is divided into two parts: Lower Tarczek (Tarczek Dolny), and Upper Tarczek (Tarczek Gorny). It has the parish church of Saint Giles. The village is located along regional road 752, which goes from Starachowice to Kielce.

In the Middle Ages, Tarczek belonged to the Bishops of Kraków, who had a manor house here, together with a church, erected in 1067 by Wladyslaw Herman, as a votum for the birth of his son Boleslaw Krzywousty. In 1227, Bishop Iwo Odrowaz, with permission of Prince of Sandomierz Leszek I the White allowed German settlers (see Ostsiedlung) to come and settle in the area of Tarczek. The village was granted Magdeburg rights in the year 1259, and was the seat of a castellan. It was a trade center of local importance, together with such towns, as Iłża and Wierzbica. In 1244, Tarczek was destroyed by Prince Konrad I of Masovia, and in 1268, it was burned in a Lithuanian raid. In the late 13th century, with permission of King Wenceslaus II of Bohemia, Tarczek was surrounded by a defensive wall.

In the mid 14th century, Bishop of Kraków Jan Bodzanta founded the town of Bodzentyn, located five kilometers from Tarczek. The bishop moved the market place and the castellany to Bodzentyn, after which Tarczek lost its importance and in 1412 was stripped of town charter. In the 15th century, Jan Długosz wrote that Tarczek used to be an important town of the bishops (oppidum notabile). Until the Partitions of Poland, the village was part of Lesser Poland's Sandomierz Voivodeship, and in 1815–1915, it belonged to Russian-controlled Congress Poland.

Main object of interest in the village is Romanesque church of Saint Giles from the first half of the 13th century, built in the location of the earlier church from 1067. It has one nave, and the church is made from limestone, with Romanesque walls, except for Western facade, which was rebuilt in the 16th century. In the southern wall of the presbytery there is a late Gothic portal. Gothic vault was rebuilt after World War II. Inside the church there are remains of a late Renaissance polychrome, a Gothic relief, a Renaissance triptych (1540), a Romanesque baptismal font, and a Baroque pulpit. The church was partly destroyed in the Swedish invasion of Poland. In the parish cemetery there are two 300-year-old tilias.
