= Krzewa =

- Village
- Location within Poland
- Coordinates: 51°7′32″N 21°9′13″E
- Country: Poland
- Voivodeship: Świętokrzyskie
- County: Starachowice
- Gmina: Mirzec
- Population: 90

Krzewa [ˈkʂɛva] is a village in the administrative district of Gmina Mirzec, within Starachowice County, Świętokrzyskie Voivodeship, in south-central Poland. It lies approximately 7 km (4 mi) east of Mirzec, 11 km (7 mi) north-east of Starachowice, and 47 km (29 mi) north-east of the regional capital Kielce.
