= Rzepin Drugi =

- Village
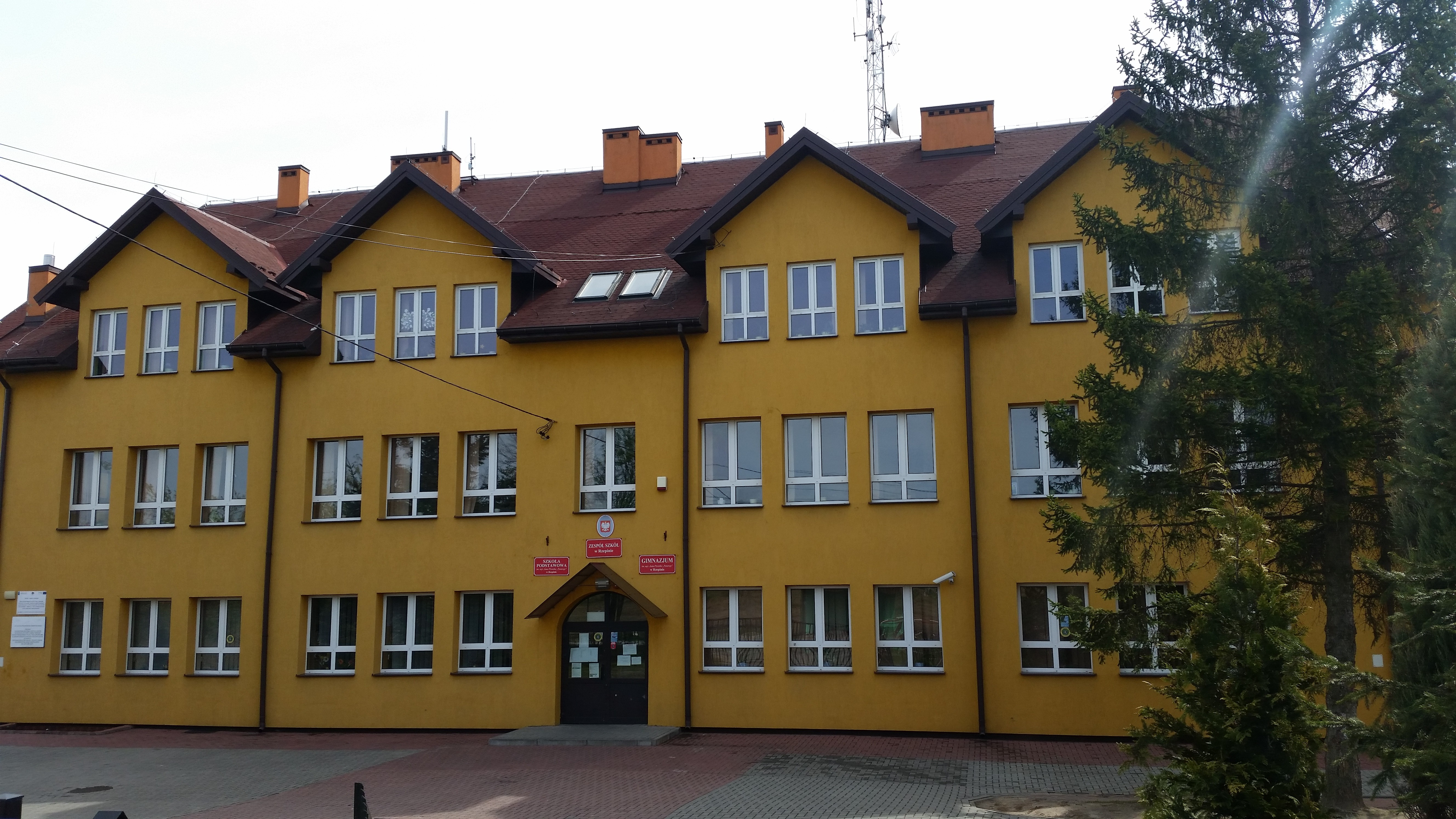
- School

- Location within Poland
- Coordinates: 50°58′47″N 21°7′0″E
- Country: Poland
- Voivodeship: Świętokrzyskie
- County: Starachowice
- Gmina: Pawłów
- Population: 960

Rzepin Drugi [ˈʐɛpin ˈdruɡi] is a village in the administrative district of Gmina Pawłów, within Starachowice County, Świętokrzyskie Voivodeship, in south-central Poland. It lies approximately 2 km (1 mi) north of Pawłów, 9 km (6 mi) south-east of Starachowice, and 37 km (23 mi) east of the regional capital Kielce.
