= Trzeszków =

- Village
- Location within Poland
- Coordinates: 50°55′28″N 21°7′19″E
- Country: Poland
- Voivodeship: Świętokrzyskie
- County: Starachowice
- Gmina: Pawłów
- Population: 370

Trzeszków [ˈtʂɛʂkuf] is a village in the administrative district of Gmina Pawłów, within Starachowice County, Świętokrzyskie Voivodeship, in south-central Poland. It lies approximately 5 km (3 mi) south of Pawłów, 15 km (9 mi) south of Starachowice, and 36 km (22 mi) east of the regional capital Kielce.
