= Tychów Nowy =

- Village
- Location within Poland
- Coordinates: 51°8′27″N 21°6′0″E
- Country: Poland
- Voivodeship: Świętokrzyskie
- County: Starachowice
- Gmina: Mirzec
- Population: 820

Tychów Nowy [ˈtɨxuf ˈnɔvɨ] is a village in the administrative district of Gmina Mirzec, within Starachowice County, Świętokrzyskie Voivodeship, in south-central Poland. It lies approximately 4 km (2 mi) east of Mirzec, 11 km (7 mi) north of Starachowice, and 45 km (28 mi) north-east of the regional capital Kielce.
