= Warszówek =

- Village
- Location within Poland
- Coordinates: 50°57′28″N 21°6′18″E
- Country: Poland
- Voivodeship: Świętokrzyskie
- County: Starachowice
- Gmina: Pawłów
- Population: 440

Warszówek [varˈʂuvɛk] is a village in the administrative district of Gmina Pawłów, within Starachowice County, Świętokrzyskie Voivodeship, in south-central Poland. It lies approximately 2 km (1 mi) south of Pawłów, 11 km (7 mi) south of Starachowice, and 36 km (22 mi) east of the regional capital Kielce.
