= Radkowice, Starachowice County =

Radkowice
- Village
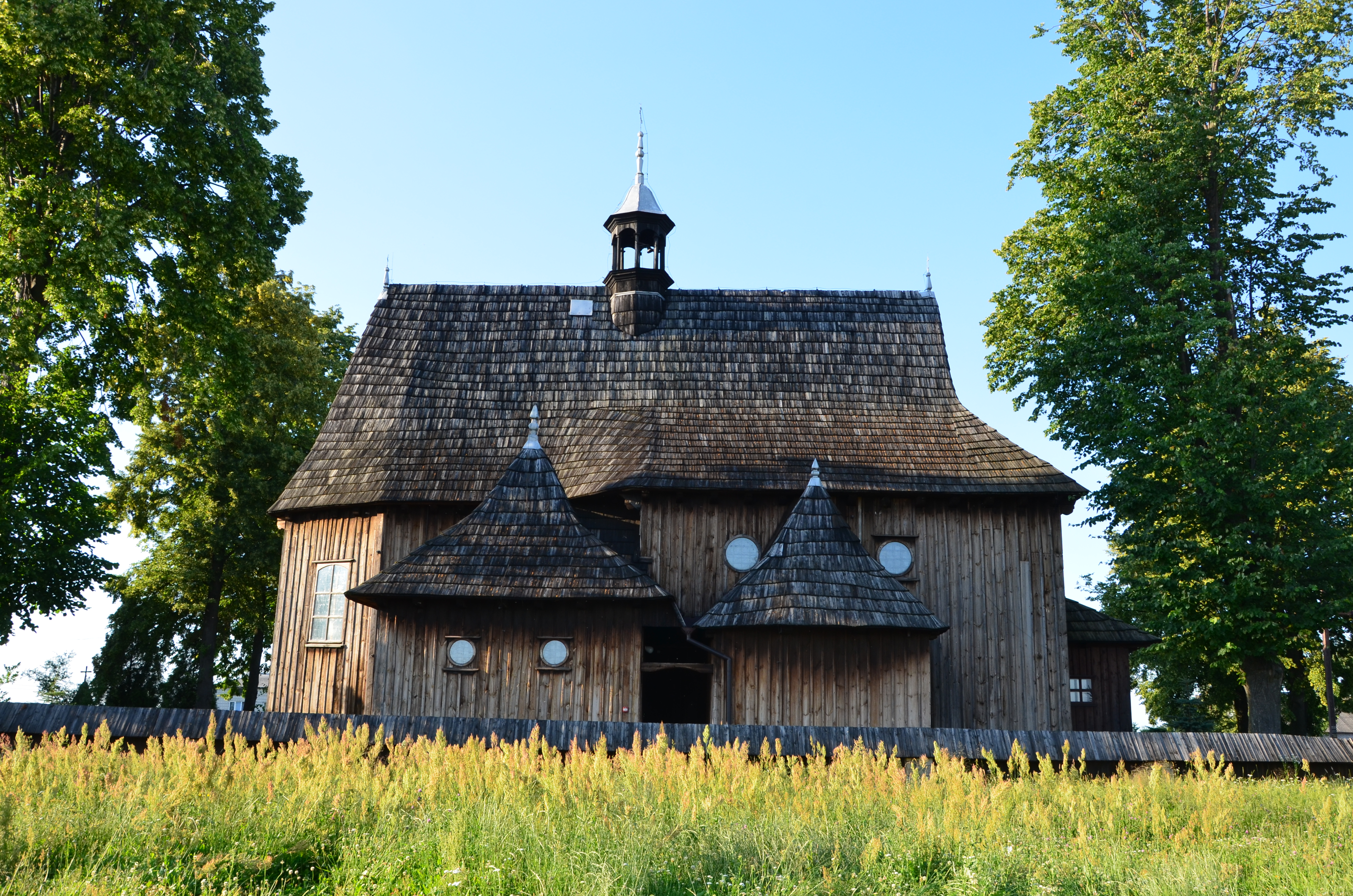
- Catholic church

- Location within Poland
- Coordinates: 50°58′52″N 21°2′2″E
- Country: Poland
- Voivodeship: Świętokrzyskie
- County: Starachowice
- Gmina: Pawłów
- Population: 610

Radkowice [ratkɔˈvit͡sɛ] is a village in the administrative district of Gmina Pawłów, within Starachowice County, Świętokrzyskie Voivodeship, in south-central Poland. It lies approximately 6 km (4 mi) west of Pawłów, 8 km (5 mi) south of Starachowice, and 32 km (20 mi) east of the regional capital Kielce.
