= Modrzewie, Świętokrzyskie Voivodeship =

Modrzewie
- Village
- Location within Poland
- Coordinates: 50°55′32″N 21°3′29″E
- Country: Poland
- Voivodeship: Świętokrzyskie
- County: Starachowice
- Gmina: Pawłów
- Population: 230

Modrzewie (Polish pronunciation: [mɔdˈʐɛvjɛ]) is a village in the administrative district of Gmina Pawłów, within Starachowice County, Świętokrzyskie Voivodeship, in south-central Poland. It lies approximately 6 km (4 mi) south-west of Pawłów, 14 km (9 mi) south of Starachowice, and 32 km (20 mi) east of the regional capital Kielce.
