= Grabków, Starachowice County =

Grabków
- Village
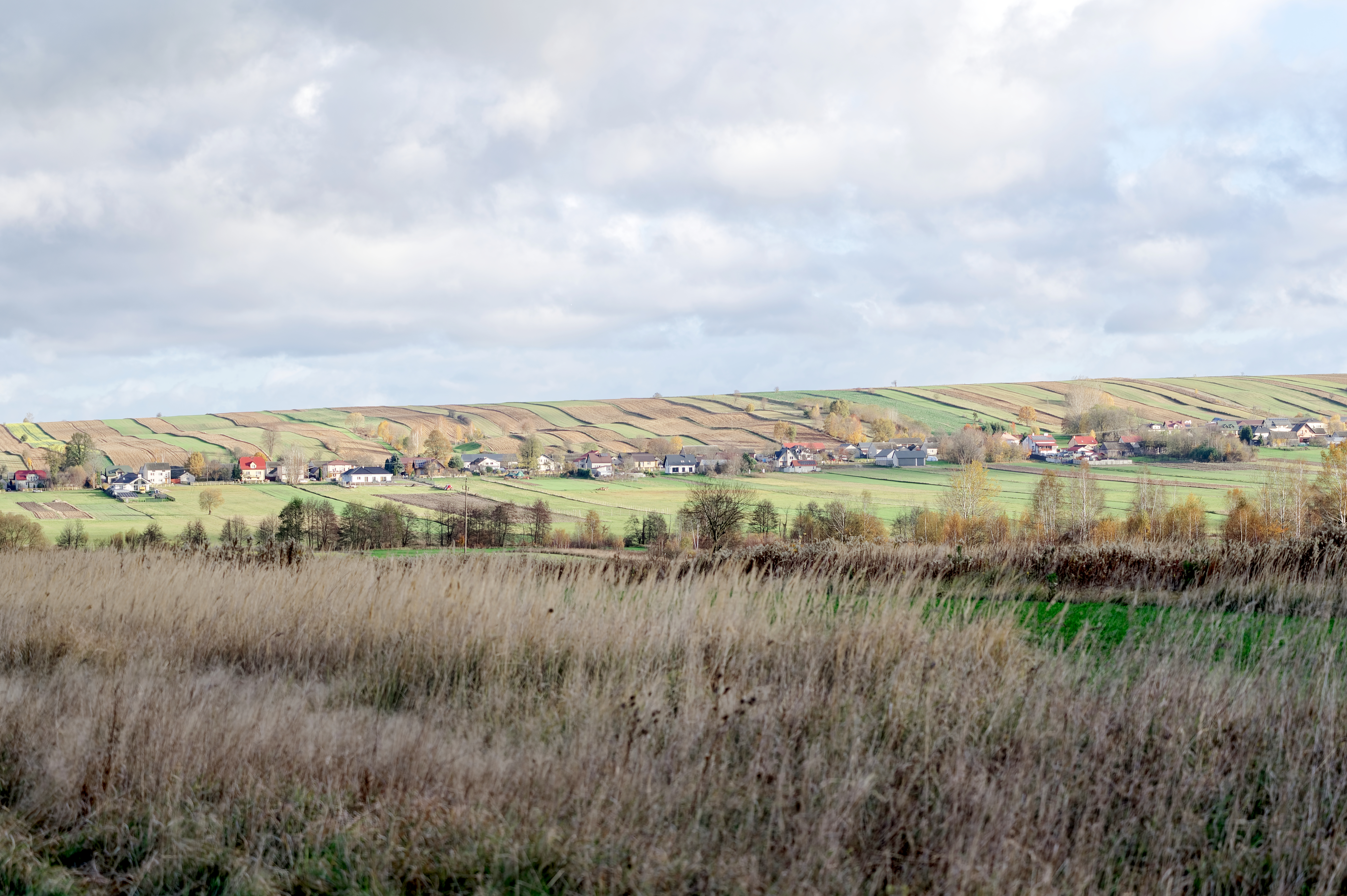

- Location within Poland
- Coordinates: 50°55′6″N 21°0′37″E
- Country: Poland
- Voivodeship: Świętokrzyskie
- County: Starachowice
- Gmina: Pawłów
- Population: 430

Grabków [ˈɡrapkuf] is a village in the administrative district of Gmina Pawłów, within Starachowice County, Świętokrzyskie Voivodeship, in south-central Poland. It lies approximately 9 km (6 mi) south-west of Pawłów, 16 km (10 mi) south of Starachowice, and 28 km (17 mi) east of the regional capital Kielce.
