= Jadowniki, Świętokrzyskie Voivodeship =

Jadowniki
- Village
- Location within Poland
- Coordinates: 50°56′59″N 21°4′32″E
- Country: Poland
- Voivodeship: Świętokrzyskie
- County: Starachowice
- Gmina: Pawłów
- Population: 750

Jadowniki [jadɔvˈniki] is a village in the administrative district of Gmina Pawłów, within Starachowice County, Świętokrzyskie Voivodeship, in south-central Poland. It lies approximately 4 km (2 mi) south-west of Pawłów, 12 km (7 mi) south of Starachowice, and 34 km (21 mi) east of the regional capital Kielce.

== History ==
In the Middle Ages, the village belonged to the Miechów monastery. (Jan Długosz Liber beneficiorum. T.III, 18).
In the nineteenth century, Jadowniki was described as a village and a manor farm, entailed in the Iłżecki poviat, Koniecek commune, and Świętomarz parish. According to the 1827 census, there were 24 houses and 149 inhabitants. According to the 1882 census, there were 46 houses, 270 inhabitants, 347 acres of manor land and 606 acres of peasants in the village.
