= Bronkowice =

- Village
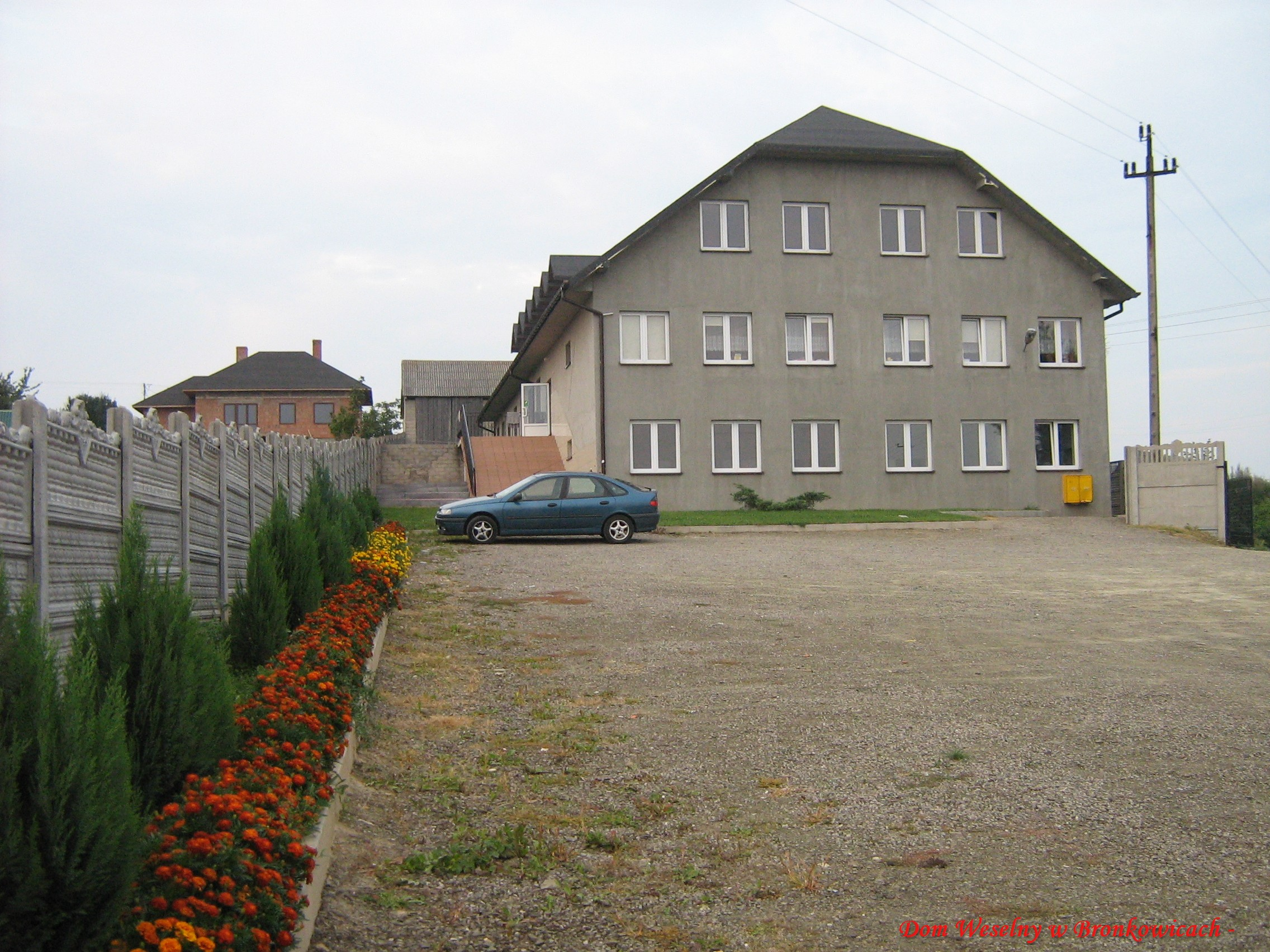

- Location within Poland
- Coordinates: 50°59′8″N 21°0′51″E
- Country: Poland
- Voivodeship: Świętokrzyskie
- County: Starachowice
- Gmina: Pawłów
- Population: 420

Bronkowice [brɔŋkɔˈvit͡sɛ] is a village in the administrative district of Gmina Pawłów, within Starachowice County, Świętokrzyskie Voivodeship, in south-central Poland. It lies approximately 8 km (5 mi) west of Pawłów, 9 km (6 mi) south-west of Starachowice, and 31 km (19 mi) east of the regional capital Kielce.
