= Nowy Jawor =

- Village
- Location within Poland
- Coordinates: 50°56′40″N 21°5′47″E
- Country: Poland
- Voivodeship: Świętokrzyskie
- County: Starachowice
- Gmina: Pawłów
- Population: 180

Nowy Jawor [ˈnɔvɨ ˈjavɔr] is a village in the administrative district of Gmina Pawłów, within Starachowice County, Świętokrzyskie Voivodeship, in south-central Poland. It lies approximately 3 km (2 mi) south of Pawłów, 12 km (7 mi) south of Starachowice, and 35 km (22 mi) east of the regional capital Kielce.
