= Ostrożanka =

- Village
- Location within Poland
- Coordinates: 51°7′0″N 21°6′45″E
- Country: Poland
- Voivodeship: Świętokrzyskie
- County: Starachowice
- Gmina: Mirzec
- Population: 400

Ostrożanka [ɔstrɔˈʐaŋka] is a village in the administrative district of Gmina Mirzec, within Starachowice County, Świętokrzyskie Voivodeship, in south-central Poland. It lies approximately 5 km (3 mi) south-east of Mirzec, 9 km (6 mi) north-east of Starachowice, and 44 km (27 mi) north-east of the regional capital Kielce.
