= Krajków, Świętokrzyskie Voivodeship =

Krajków
- Village
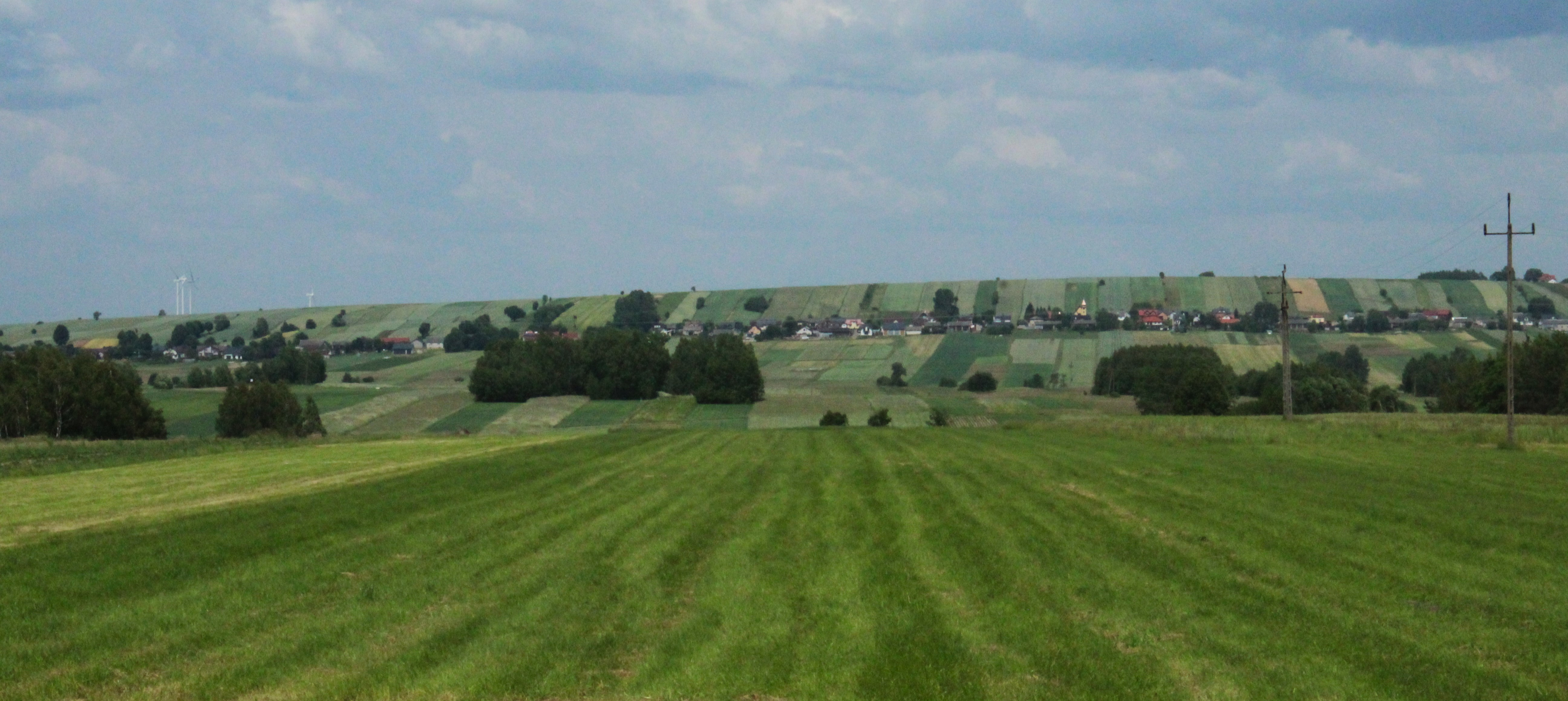

- Location within Poland
- Coordinates: 50°55′4″N 21°1′40″E
- Country: Poland
- Voivodeship: Świętokrzyskie
- County: Starachowice
- Gmina: Pawłów
- Population: 240

Krajków [ˈkrai̯kuf] is a village in the administrative district of Gmina Pawłów, within Starachowice County, Świętokrzyskie Voivodeship, in south-central Poland. It lies approximately 8 km (5 mi) south-west of Pawłów, 15 km (9 mi) south of Starachowice, and 30 km (19 mi) east of the regional capital Kielce.
