= Trębowiec Mały =

- Village
- Location within Poland
- Coordinates: 51°9′11″N 21°4′7″E
- Country: Poland
- Voivodeship: Świętokrzyskie
- County: Starachowice
- Gmina: Mirzec

Trębowiec Mały [trɛmˈbɔvjɛt͡s ˈmawɨ] is a village in the administrative district of Gmina Mirzec, within Starachowice County, Świętokrzyskie Voivodeship, in south-central Poland. It lies approximately 3 km (2 mi) north-east of Mirzec, 12 km (7 mi) north of Starachowice, and 44 km (27 mi) north-east of the regional capital Kielce.
