= Szerzawy, Świętokrzyskie Voivodeship =

Szerzawy
- Village
- Location within Poland
- Coordinates: 50°56′53″N 21°2′11″E
- Country: Poland
- Voivodeship: Świętokrzyskie
- County: Starachowice
- Gmina: Pawłów
- Population: 750

Szerzawy [ʂɛˈʐavɨ] is a village in the administrative district of Gmina Pawłów, within Starachowice County, Świętokrzyskie Voivodeship, in south-central Poland. It lies approximately 6 km (4 mi) west of Pawłów, 12 km (7 mi) south of Starachowice, and 31 km (19 mi) east of the regional capital Kielce.
