= Brzezie, Starachowice County =

Brzezie
- Village
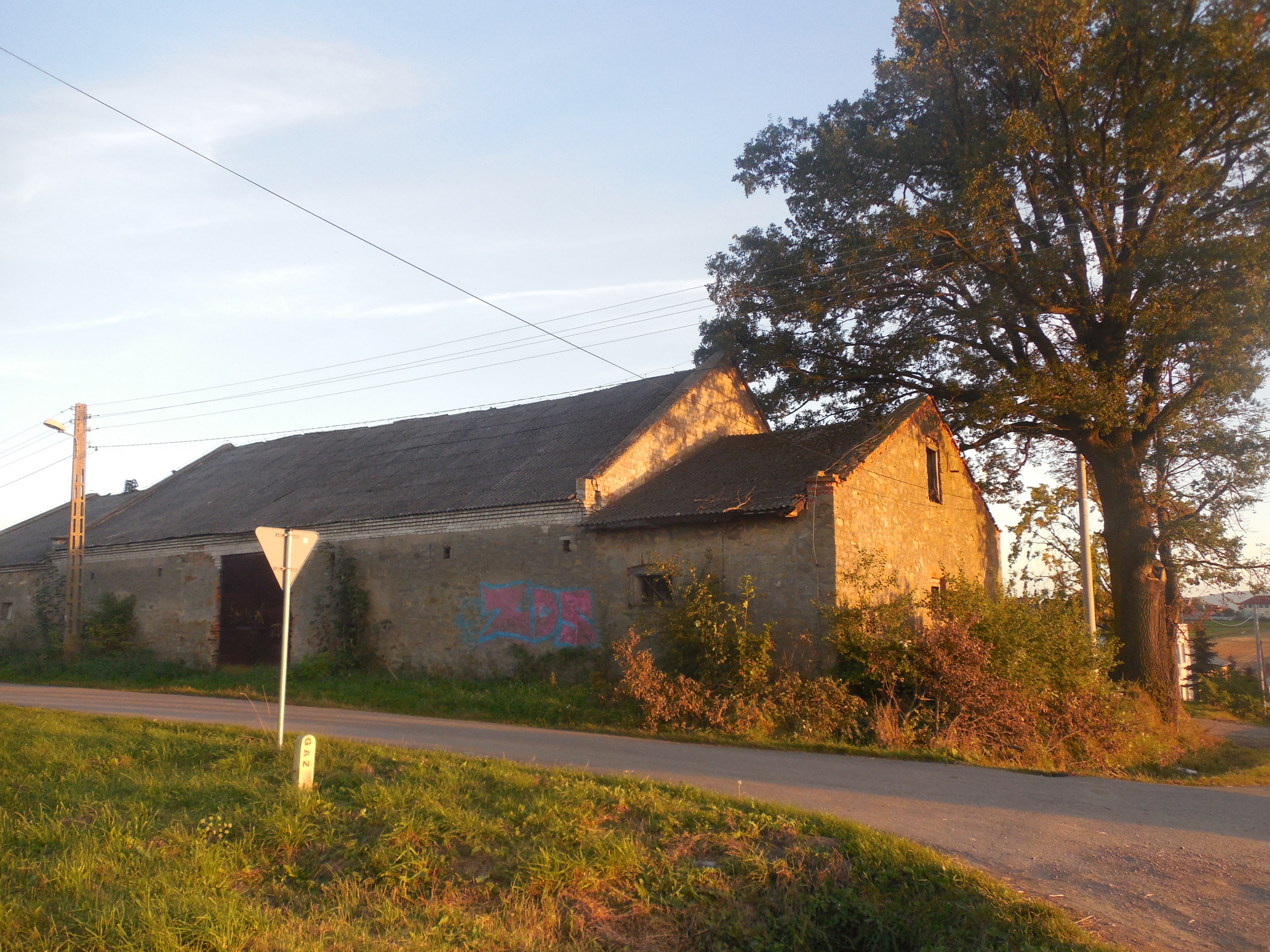

- Location within Poland
- Coordinates: 50°56′12″N 21°3′6″E
- Country: Poland
- Voivodeship: Świętokrzyskie
- County: Starachowice
- Gmina: Pawłów
- Population: 520

Brzezie [ˈbʐɛʑɛ] is a village in the administrative district of Gmina Pawłów, within Starachowice County, Świętokrzyskie Voivodeship, in south-central Poland. It lies approximately 6 km (4 mi) south-west of Pawłów, 13 km (8 mi) south of Starachowice, and 32 km (20 mi) east of the regional capital Kielce.
