= Wieloborowice =

- Village
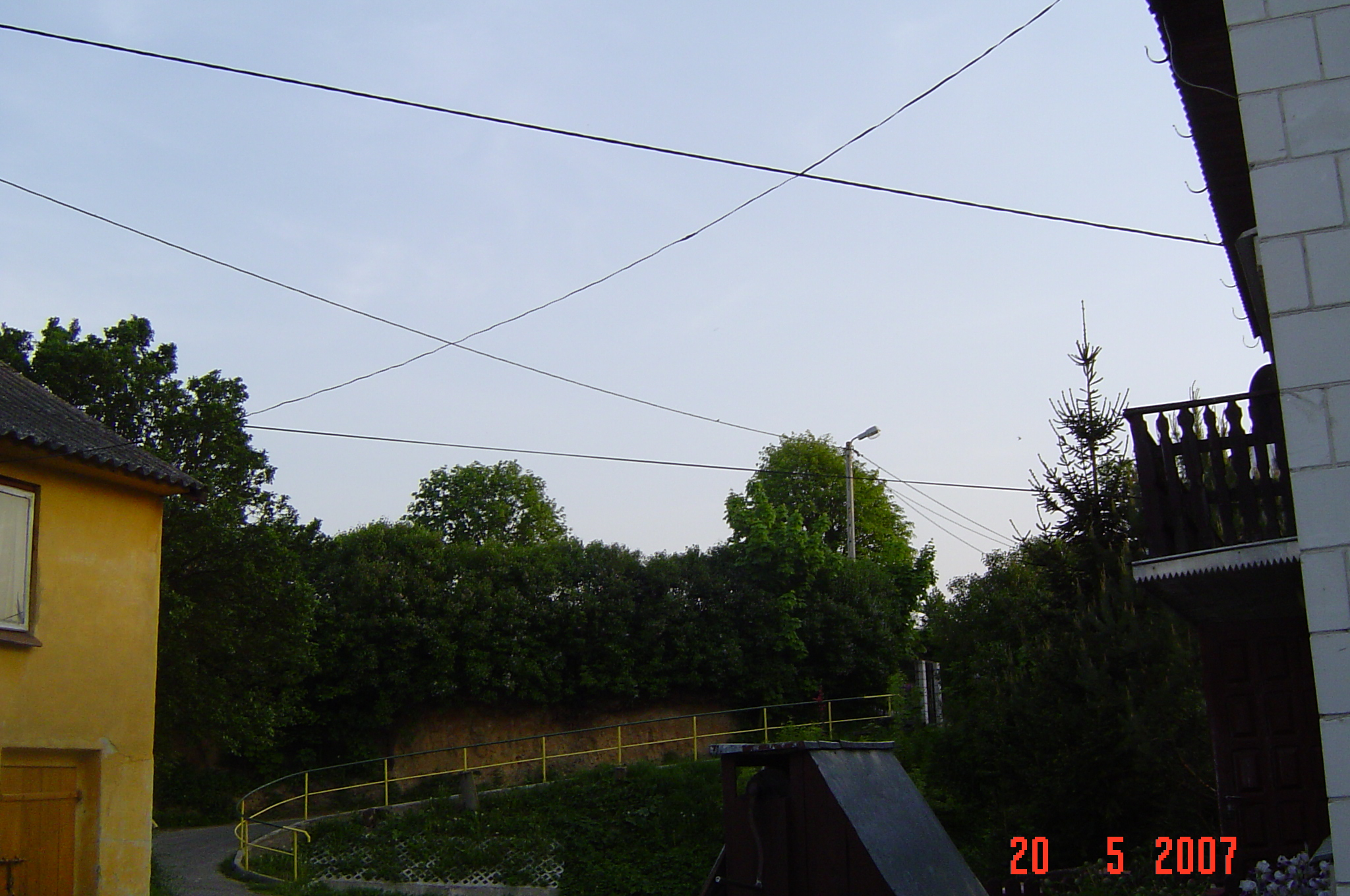

- Location within Poland
- Coordinates: 50°55′11″N 21°7′50″E
- Country: Poland
- Voivodeship: Świętokrzyskie
- County: Starachowice
- Gmina: Pawłów
- Population: 310

Wieloborowice [vjɛlɔbɔrɔˈvit͡sɛ] is a village in the administrative district of Gmina Pawłów, within Starachowice County, Świętokrzyskie Voivodeship, in south-central Poland. It lies approximately 6 km (4 mi) south of Pawłów, 16 km (10 mi) south of Starachowice, and 37 km (23 mi) east of the regional capital Kielce.
