= Stary Bostów =

- Village
- Location within Poland
- Coordinates: 50°54′26″N 21°5′6″E
- Country: Poland
- Voivodeship: Świętokrzyskie
- County: Starachowice
- Gmina: Pawłów
- Population: 430

Stary Bostów [ˈstarɨ ˈbɔstuf] is a village in the administrative district of Gmina Pawłów, within Starachowice County, Świętokrzyskie Voivodeship, in south-central Poland. It lies approximately 7 km (4 mi) south of Pawłów, 16 km (10 mi) south of Starachowice, and 33 km (21 mi) east of the regional capital Kielce.
