= Rzepinek, Świętokrzyskie Voivodeship =

Rzepinek
- Village
- Location within Poland
- Coordinates: 50°57′47″N 21°3′13″E
- Country: Poland
- Voivodeship: Świętokrzyskie
- County: Starachowice
- Gmina: Pawłów
- Population: 150

Rzepinek [ʐɛˈpinɛk] is a village in the administrative district of Gmina Pawłów, within Starachowice County, Świętokrzyskie Voivodeship, in south-central Poland. It lies approximately 4 km (2 mi) west of Pawłów, 10 km (6 mi) south of Starachowice, and 32 km (20 mi) east of the regional capital Kielce.
