= Rzepin-Kolonia =

- Village
- Location within Poland
- Coordinates: 50°57′55″N 21°5′4″E
- Country: Poland
- Voivodeship: Świętokrzyskie
- County: Starachowice
- Gmina: Pawłów
- Population: 560

Rzepin-Kolonia [ˈʐɛpin kɔˈlɔɲa] is a village in the administrative district of Gmina Pawłów, within Starachowice County, Świętokrzyskie Voivodeship, in south-central Poland. It lies approximately 2 km (1 mi) west of Pawłów, 10 km (6 mi) south of Starachowice, and 35 km (22 mi) east of the regional capital Kielce.
