= Osiny, Starachowice County =

Osiny
- Village
- Location within Poland
- Coordinates: 51°11′23″N 21°5′33″E
- Country: Poland
- Voivodeship: Świętokrzyskie
- County: Starachowice
- Gmina: Mirzec
- Population: 780

Osiny [ɔˈɕinɨ] is a village in the administrative district of Gmina Mirzec, within Starachowice County, Świętokrzyskie Voivodeship, in south-central Poland. It lies approximately 7 km (4 mi) north of Mirzec, 16 km (10 mi) north of Starachowice, and 48 km (30 mi) north-east of the regional capital Kielce.
