= Stary Jawor =

- Village
- Location within Poland
- Coordinates: 50°56′39″N 21°5′6″E
- Country: Poland
- Voivodeship: Świętokrzyskie
- County: Starachowice
- Gmina: Pawłów
- Population: 80

Stary Jawor [ˈstarɨ ˈjavɔr] is a village in the administrative district of Gmina Pawłów, within Starachowice County, Świętokrzyskie Voivodeship, in south-central Poland. It lies approximately 4 km (2 mi) south-west of Pawłów, 12 km (7 mi) south of Starachowice, and 34 km (21 mi) east of the regional capital Kielce.
