= Małyszyn Dolny =

- Village
- Location within Poland
- Coordinates: 51°6′23″N 21°9′6″E
- Country: Poland
- Voivodeship: Świętokrzyskie
- County: Starachowice
- Gmina: Mirzec

Małyszyn Dolny [maˈwɨʂɨn ˈdɔlnɨ] is a village in the administrative district of Gmina Mirzec, within Starachowice County, Świętokrzyskie Voivodeship, in south-central Poland. It lies approximately 8 km (5 mi) south-east of Mirzec, 10 km (6 mi) north-east of Starachowice, and 46 km (29 mi) north-east of the regional capital Kielce.
