= Radkowice-Kolonia =

- Village
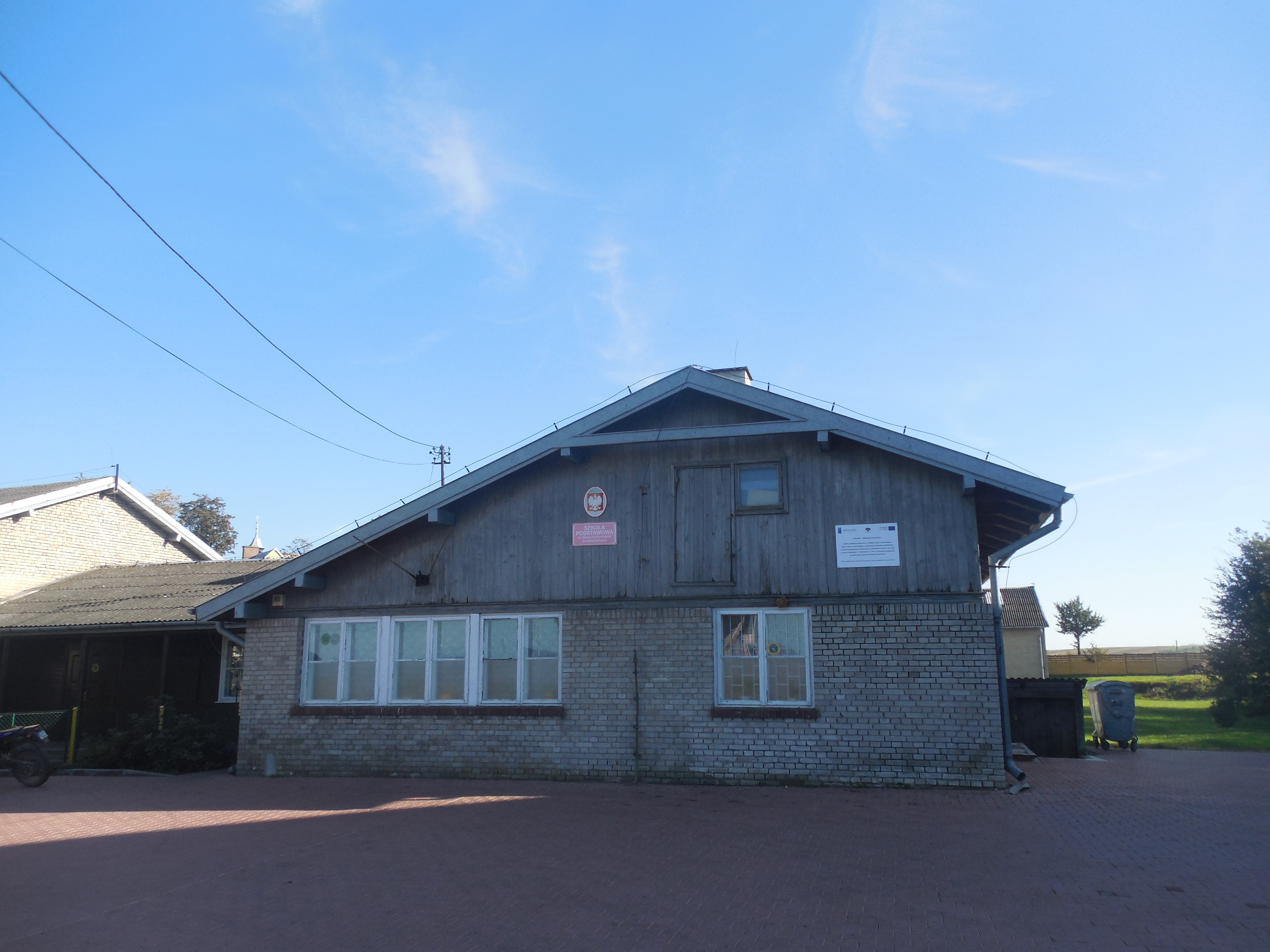
- School

- Location within Poland
- Coordinates: 50°58′22″N 21°1′33″E
- Country: Poland
- Voivodeship: Świętokrzyskie
- County: Starachowice
- Gmina: Pawłów

Radkowice-Kolonia [ratkɔˈvit͡sɛ kɔˈlɔɲa] is a village in the administrative district of Gmina Pawłów, within Starachowice County, Świętokrzyskie Voivodeship, in south-central Poland. It lies approximately 6 km (4 mi) west of Pawłów, 10 km (6 mi) south of Starachowice, and 31 km (19 mi) east of the regional capital Kielce.
