= Łomno, Świętokrzyskie Voivodeship =

Łomno
- Village
- Location within Poland
- Coordinates: 50°54′43″N 21°2′38″E
- Country: Poland
- Voivodeship: Świętokrzyskie
- County: Starachowice
- Gmina: Pawłów
- Population: 700

Łomno [ˈwɔmnɔ] is a village in the administrative district of Gmina Pawłów, within Starachowice County, Świętokrzyskie Voivodeship, in south-central Poland. It lies approximately 8 km (5 mi) south-west of Pawłów, 16 km (10 mi) south of Starachowice, and 31 km (19 mi) east of the regional capital Kielce.
