= Dąbrowa, Starachowice County =

Dąbrowa
- Village
- Location within Poland
- Coordinates: 50°58′25″N 21°8′29″E
- Country: Poland
- Voivodeship: Świętokrzyskie
- County: Starachowice
- Gmina: Pawłów
- Elevation: 320 m (1,050 ft)
- Population: 900

Dąbrowa [dɔmˈbrɔva] is a village in the administrative district of Gmina Pawłów, within Starachowice County, Świętokrzyskie Voivodeship, in south-central Poland. It lies approximately 3 km (2 mi) east of Pawłów, 10 km (6 mi) south-east of Starachowice, and 39 km (24 mi) east of the regional capital Kielce.
