= Kałków, Świętokrzyskie Voivodeship =

Kałków
- Village
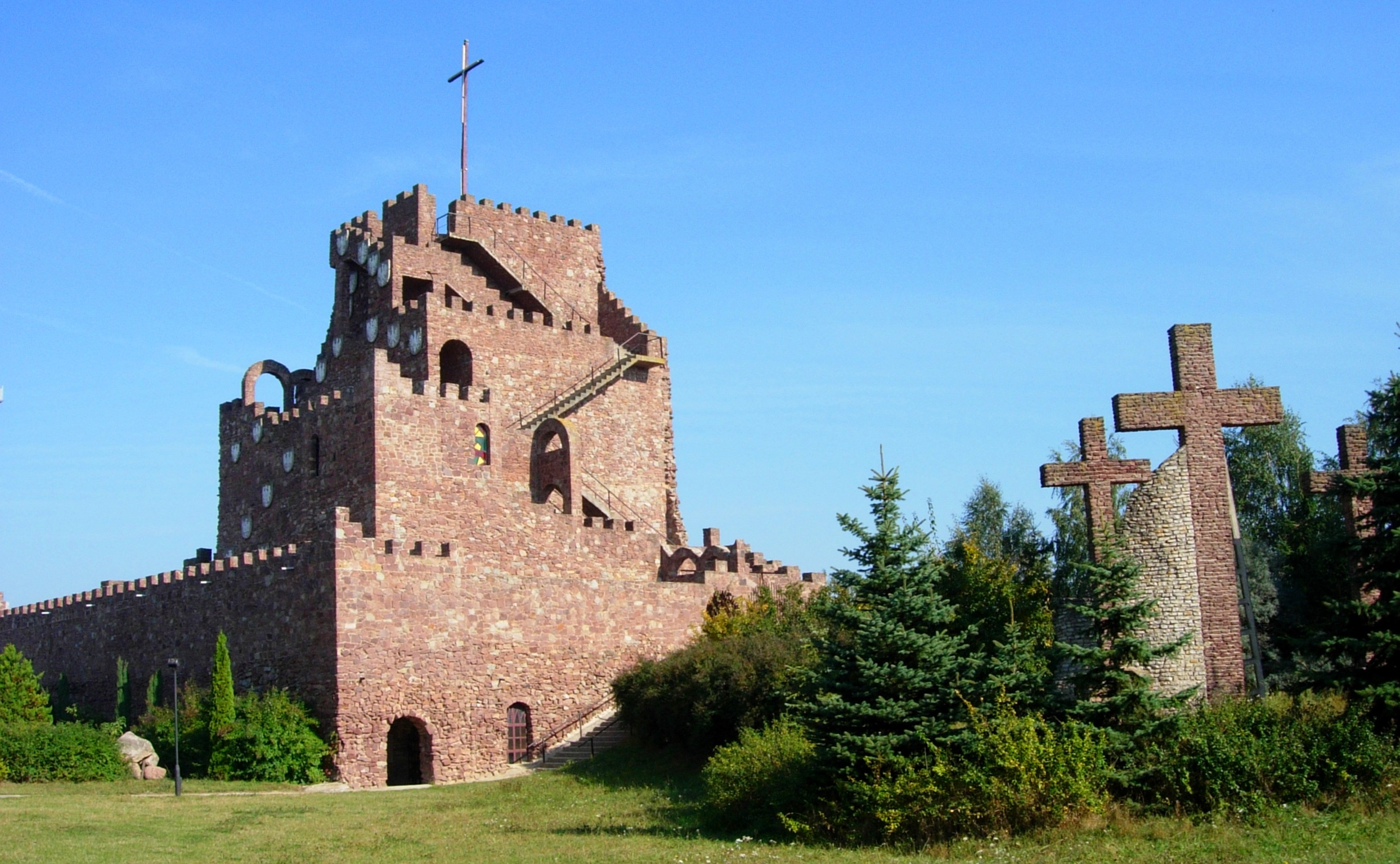

- Location within Poland
- Coordinates: 50°57′36″N 21°10′2″E
- Country: Poland
- Voivodeship: Świętokrzyskie
- County: Starachowice
- Gmina: Pawłów
- Elevation: 325 m (1,066 ft)
- Population: 490
- Website: http://www.kalkowgodow.bnx.pl

Kałków [ˈkau̯kuf] is a village in the administrative district of Gmina Pawłów, within Starachowice County, Świętokrzyskie Voivodeship, in south-central Poland. It lies approximately 5 km (3 mi) east of Pawłów, 13 km (8 mi) south-east of Starachowice, and 40 km (25 mi) east of the regional capital Kielce.
