= Nieczulice, Świętokrzyskie Voivodeship =

Nieczulice
- Village
- Location within Poland
- Coordinates: 50°54′55″N 21°6′27″E
- Country: Poland
- Voivodeship: Świętokrzyskie
- County: Starachowice
- Gmina: Pawłów
- Population: 470

Nieczulice [ɲɛt͡ʂuˈlit͡sɛ] is a village in the administrative district of Gmina Pawłów, within Starachowice County, Świętokrzyskie Voivodeship, in south-central Poland. It lies approximately 6 km (4 mi) south of Pawłów, 16 km (10 mi) south of Starachowice, and 35 km (22 mi) east of the regional capital Kielce.

Miłoszów is the name of a part of Nieczulice and of a nearby forest, from which a rich fossil fauna (Devonian in age) was reported.
