= Włodzimierz Szpak =

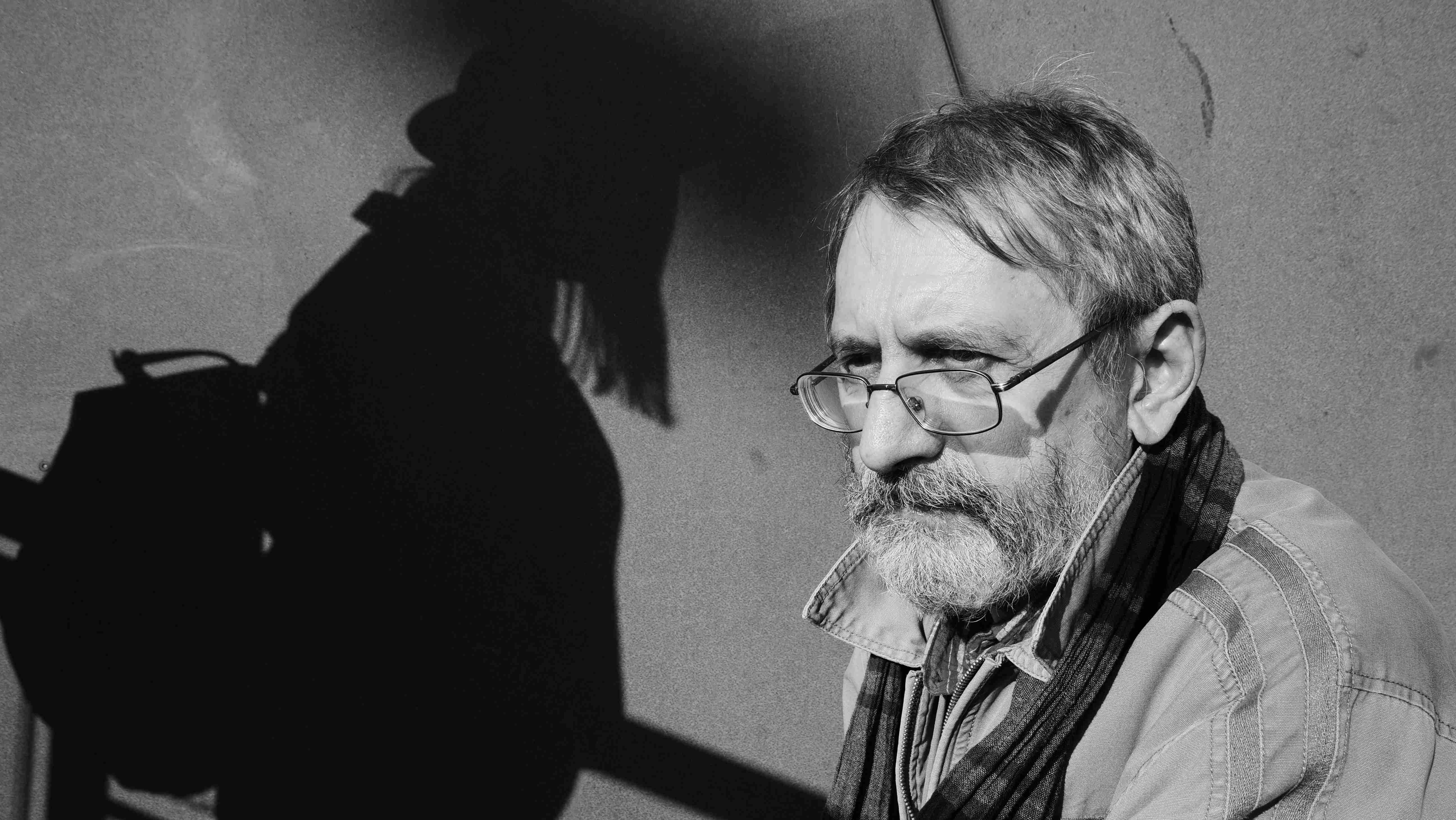
- Born: 11 February 1950 (age 76)
- Education: University of Warsaw, National Film School in Łódź
- Occupation: Documentary filmmaker

Włodzimierz Szpak (born 11 February 1950) is a Polish documentary film director, photographer and author.

== Biography ==
Włodzimierz Szpak was born in Milanówek, Poland. He graduated from University of Warsaw in 1975. Then he continued his studies at the National Film School (in Łódź, Poland). He is a member of Polish Filmmakers Association.

== Work ==
He was active in an area of documentary film-making. There are 28 films of that kind in his creative production. Nevertheless, he started his career with the psychological story entitled "Ona" ("She") in the narrative film "On, ona, oni" ("He, She, They").

He had also directed the two theater plays: 1) "Rekonstrukcja poety" ("The Reconstruction of the Poet") which refers to the antiquity thread in Zbigniew Herbert’s literary output, and 2) "Noce narodowe" ("Nights of the Nation") by Roman Brandstaetter.

His films, e.g. "Ludzie z ziemi czerwonej" ("People of Red Land"), "Krajobraz z gęsią" ("Landscape with Goose"), "Boże, zbaw Rosję" ("God Save Russia") had been discussed and commented by domestic and foreign mass media.

He was awarded at some international film festivals. In 1986 he won a "Silver Dancer" prize at the Huesca International Film Festival for a documentary film ‘’Ludzie z ziemi czerwonej’’ ("People of Red Land"). Then in 1989 he won a "Special Reward", at the International Włodzimierz Puchalski Film Festival in Łódź – for "Krajobraz z gęsią" ("Landscape with Goose"). He took part in the TV programme in series "Mistrzowie dokumentu" ("Document Masters") as well, which was transmitted by "Kino Polska" TV channel.

== Filmography ==
Year	Title	Function	Genre	Notes
2005	Ochrona srodowiska. Wyzwania dla Polski u progu XXI wieku ("Environmental protection – Challenges for Poland at the Start of the 21st Century")	Screenplay, director	Documentary TV series	Cooperation in Screenplay: Janusz Radziejowski, Cinematographer: Jacek Knopp
2001	Impuls Amerykański. Rzecz o Henryku Sienkiewiczu ("American Incentive – Story on Henryk Sienkiewicz")	Screenwriter, director	Documentary film with plot element.	Cinematographer: Stanisław Szymański, Costumes: Renata Własow
1998	Mord W Jekaterynburgu (Murder in Yekaterinburg)	Screenwriter, director	Documentary film	
1997	Przeciwko żywotnym interesom PRL (Against Vital Affairs Of Polish People's Republic)	Screenwriter, director	Documentary film	Cinematographer: Julian Szczerkowski
1997	TYGRYS (A Tiger)	Screenwriter, director	Documentary film, See: William Blake's poem: "The Tyger"	Cinematographer: Julian Szczerkowski
1996	Fałdy, draperie ("Clothing Folds, Draperys")	Screenwriter, director	Documentary film	Cinematographer: Julian Szczerkowski
1995	Balkony ("Balconys")	Screenwriter, director	Documentary film	Cinematographer: Julian Szczerkowski
1995	Marszałkowska i okolice ("Marszałkowska Street and Neighbourhood")	Screenwriter, director	Documentary film	Cinematographer: Julian Szczerkowski
1994	Karaimi. Ginący Naród ("Crimean Karaites. Vanishing Nation")	Screenwriter, director	Documentary film	Cinematographer: Stanisław Szabłowski
1994	Analiza| ("Analysis")	Screenwriter, director		Cinematographer: Julian Szczerkowski
1992	Potomkowie wielkich rodów ("Descendants of Good Stock")	Screenwriter, director	Documentary film	Cinematographer: Artur Radźko
1990	Boże, zbaw Rosję ("God Save Russia") – see online: https://vod.pl/filmy-dokumentalne/boze-zbaw-rosje-online-za-darmo/ydmx43y	Screenwriter, director	Documentary film	Cinematographer: Jerzy Rudziński; Counsellor: Aleksander Achmatowicz
1990	Jam Dwór Polski ("I'm Polish Mansion House")	Screenwriter, director	Documentary film	Cinematographers: Jolanta Dylewska, Rafael Marziano
1989	Hunowie ("Huns")	Screenwriter, director	Documentary film	Cinematographer: Artur Radźko
1988	...I w Ostrej świecisz Bramie ("...and shines in Ostra Brama"	Screenwriter, director	Documentary film	Cinematographer: Artur Radźko
1988	BAROK WILEŃSKI ("Baroque of Vilnius")	Screenwriter, director	Documentary film	Cinematographer: Artur Radźko
1987	Chłopi ("Peasants")	Screenwriter, director	Documentary film	
1987	Krajobraz Z Gęsią ("Landscape with a Goose"	Screenwriter, director	Documentary film	Cinematographer: Artur Radźko
1986	ECHA LEŚNE ("Echos of Forests")	Screenwriter, director	Documentary film	
1986	Ludzie z Ziemi Czerwonej ("People of Red Land")	Screenwriter, director	Documentary film	Cinematographer: Tadeusz Wudzki
1985	Wieś ("A Village")	Screenwriter, director	Documentary film	Cinematographer:Julian Szczerkowski
1984	Drogi ("Roads]")	Screenwriter, director	Documentary film	Cinematographer: Stefan Czyżewski
1984	Lato Leśnych Ludzi ("Summer of People of Forest")	Joint Director	TV series	
1981	On, Ona, Oni ("He, She, They")	Collaboration	Narrative film	
1981	Ona ("She")	Screenwriter, director	psychological story	Cinematographer: Jan Mogilnicki
1981	Puszcza Świętokrzyska ("Old-growth forest of Świętokrzyskie Mountains")	Screenwriter, director	Documentary film	
1978	Borsucza 7 ("7, Borsucza Street)	Screenwriter, director	School study	
1977	Analiza ("An Analysis")	Screenwriter, director	School study	
1976	Lina ("A Rope")	Screenwriter, director	School study	
1976	STAWISKO	Screenwriter, director	School study	The film concerns Jarosław Iwaszkiewicz property "Stawisko" near Podkowa Leśna, Poland

Sources: 1) Polish Filmmakers Association, see internet site: https://www.sfp.org.pl/osoba,0,1,58347,Wlodzimierz-Szpak.html [Acc.: 20 December 2020] and 2) "Filmweb" – see internet site: https://www.filmweb.pl/person/W%C5%82odzimierz+Szpak-105916 [Acc.: 20. 12. 2020]

== Awards ==
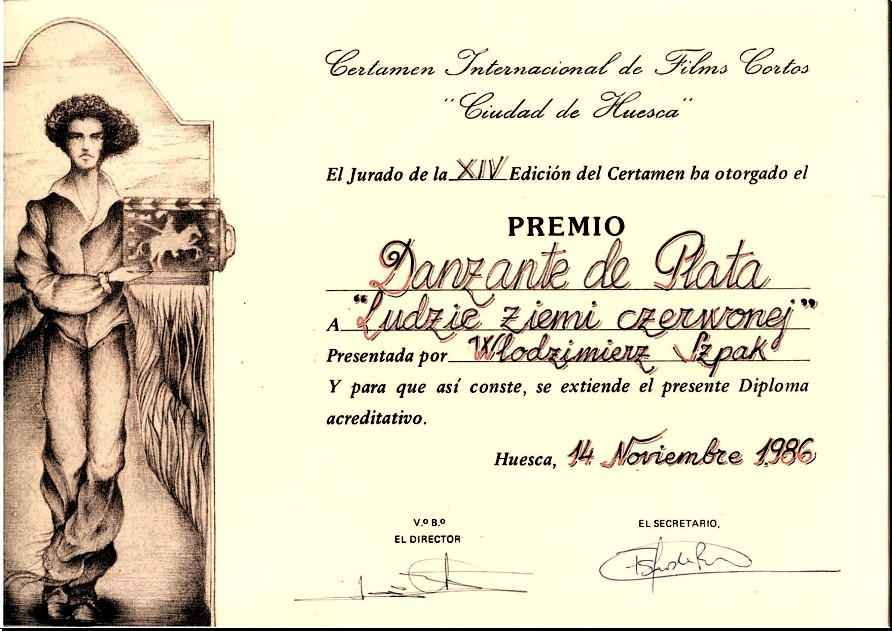
Diploma of "Silver Dancer" prize at the Huesca, (Spain), International Film Festival for a documentary film "Ludzie z ziemi czerwonej" ("People of Red Land").

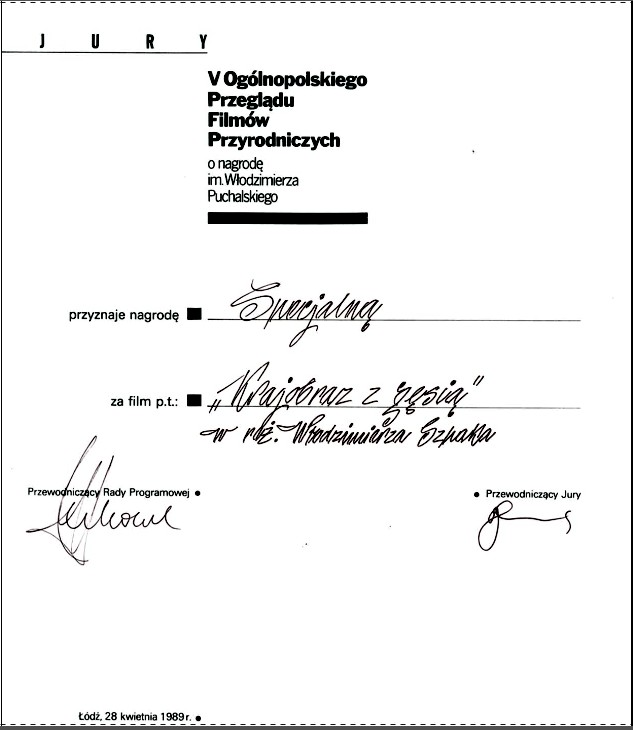
Diploma of "Special Reward", at the International Włodzimierz Puchalski Film Festival in Łódź – for "Krajobraz z gęsią" ("Landscape with Goose").

- 1986

He was awarded at a few international film festivals. Namely, in 1986 he won a "Silver Dancer" prize at the Huesca (Spain) International Film Festival for a documentary film "Ludzie z ziemi czerwonej" ("People of Red Land").

- 1989

He won a "Special Reward", at the International Włodzimierz Puchalski Film Festival in Łódź – for "Krajobraz z gęsią" ("Landscape with Goose").
