= Zakrzewski family =

Family of Polish serial killers

- Born: Rzepin Pierwszy, Poland
- Died: February 1972 (Józef and Czesław); Montelupich Prison, Kraków, Poland
- Cause of death: Execution by hanging (Józef and Czesław); Suicide by hanging (Adam)
- Conviction: Murder x9
- Penalty: Death (Józef and Czesław); 25 years imprisonment (Adam)

Details
- Victims: 8
- Span of crimes: 1954–1969
- Country: Poland
- State: Świętokrzyskie
- Date apprehended: February 1970 (Czesław); July 1970 (Józef and Adam)

The Zakrzewski family was a family of Polish serial killers who committed eight murders in rural Poland from 1954 to 1969, including the killing of a five-member family in Rzepin Pierwszy in 1969. For the last crime, the 66-year-old father, Józef, and his 42-year-old elder son Czesław were sentenced to death and executed, while the younger, 24-year-old Adam, was sentenced to 25 years imprisonment. However, Adam later hanged himself in prison.

== Family ==
The Zakrzewski family consisted of Józef (aged 66 at the time of the murders); his wife Halina (age unknown); their two sons Czesław (aged 44) and Adam (aged 22); and an unnamed daughter that was not involved in the murders at all. The Zakrzewski family were wealthy, with a large farm, but Józef was noted to have constantly owed back taxes. The family was not very well liked in their village. Józef was physically abusive towards his children. Czesław was previously convicted of several instances of robbery, including with a weapon. He was very close to his father, and carried out Józef's orders out of fear. Adam was suspected of a past robbery.

== Lipa family murders ==
On the night of 2 to 3 November 1969, on the Catholic holiday of All Souls' Day, the villagers of Rzepin Pierwszy noticed a fire originating from the mayor's house. Numerous people rushed in to help, but by the time of their arrival, the house had burned down and all five people inhabitants (45-year-old Mieczysław Lipa; his 27-year-old nephew Władysław and his pregnant 18-year-old wife Krystyna; his 54-year-old sister-in-law Zofia and his 81-year-old mother Maria) had perished. Initially, it was considered an unfortunate accident, but an autopsy report concluded that all five victims had skull fractures inflicted with a blunt instrument, as well as cuts and stab wounds, which were later determined to have been inflicted with an axe and a hoe. It was also concluded that the killer or killers had set bundles of straw on fire in the yard to in an attempt to cover up their tracks.

In the beginning, authorities considered two possible motives: robbery, as Mieczysław Lipa was known to possess approximately 20,000 złoty collected from taxes, or possibly revenge. In an order to prevent panic amongst the villagers, the police quickly narrowed down the suspect list to about 40 people, among which were Józef and Czesław Zakrzewski. The former was known for his frequent spats with the mayor for not paying his taxes and refusing to provide agricultural goods, while the latter, a petty criminal with numerous convictions for robbery and other small crimes, was known for carrying around a gun on him at all times.

== Investigations and revelations ==
At first, no concrete evidence pointed towards the Zakrzewski family members being guilty, but investigators long considered Czesław as a prime suspect, since he had no alibi and his wife confirmed that he was not at home at the date of the murders. In February 1970, he was arrested for stealing wood from the forest and detained in prison. While he was incarcerated, an undercover Milicja Obywatelska (MO) agent was placed as his cellmate and attempted to obtain incriminating from Czesław, while the Zakrzewski household was wiretapped. In July 1970, the investigators received their breakthrough when the MO agent convinced Czesław to write a letter to Radio Free Europe, in which he admitted to the crime and claimed that it was an act of defiance against communist Poland, claiming that organization members would free him and repatriate him to the West.

As a result of this development, Czesław was charged with the murders of the Lipa family, while his father and younger brother Adam were arrested as accomplices. At the interrogations, he described the killings in detail, and also admitted to three unsolved murders which he had committed with his father from the mid-1950s to the 1960:

- 1954: stabbed to death the local dentist, Jan Borowiec, who was known for pulling out teeth with pliers.
- 7 June 1954: Józef and Czesław shot and killed Starachowice native Bolesław Hartung near a forest road.
- 13 December 1957: in the early morning, the pair broke into the house of former mayor Jerzy Jan Żaczkiewicz, wrapping his head in a towel and placing a cow chain around his neck. He was then led outside to the well, where the Zakrzewskis pulled his pants down to his ankles, exposing his buttocks, then stabbed him through the nape with a bayonet. They then threw the body into the well, where it was found by his 6-year-old daughter on the next morning.

During the interrogations, Czesław claimed that the entire family practised a strange ritual before each murder: they issued a "death sentence" to those they felt had wronged them, placing crosses and candlesticks on a table in Józef's room. There, they would pray to the Virgin Mary, and his mother, Halina, would allegedly utter chants such as "Let Borowiec, let it drip", and when it ended, Józef and Czesław would have a year to commit the murder. When interviewed, Halina Zakrzewska denied culpability, and no evidence pointed towards her knowing about the crimes.

Czesław Zakrzewski fully admitted to the murders, as well as unrelated robberies, thefts and arsons. He indicated to the authorities where he had hidden a gun, bloodied clothing, a balaclava he wore while committing the murders and other incriminating evidence, and claimed that his killings were justified, as all of the victims were connected to the state apparatus, and thus were enemies in his fight against communism. It was eventually revealed that a judge from the Starachowice district court, Stanisław W., who had been introduced to Czesław and Józef as an agent of Radio Free Europe and had made them swear allegiance to a skull, had helped cover up the family's crimes. For this, he was sentenced to 4 years imprisonment. During the interrogations, all three suspects appeared to act as if they were mentally unstable, which was semi-plausible, as psychiatric evaluations determined that they all had below-average intelligence and had trouble comprehending complex emotions.

== Trial and execution ==
The trial of the Zakrzewski family was widely reported on in the press and media at the time, and during court hearings, agitated crowds demanded that the perpetrators be lynched. Czesław, who believed to the very end that he would be rescued by Radio Free Europe agents, was determined to be the main killer. In an effort to save his younger son from the death penalty, Józef Zakrzewski broke down during a court hearing and placed the blame on himself, pleading with the justices to spare Adam's life. The trial began on 22 March 1971, at the Provincial Court in Kielce, and on the final judgment on 28 June of that year, the court found all three of them guilty. Józef and Czesław Zakrzewski were sentenced to death, while Adam was given 25 years imprisonment, as life imprisonment had been abolished at the time. The Supreme Court upheld the verdicts, and the Council of State refused to grant any of them a pardon. In February 1972, Józef and Czesław were both hanged in a Montelupich Prison in Kraków; a few years later, Adam killed himself by hanging in his prison cell. Due to the notoriety of the crime, the remaining family members were constantly harassed by fellow villagers, forcing them to flee, and their farm eventually fell into disarray.

== See also ==
- List of serial killers by country
