= Bukówka, Świętokrzyskie Voivodeship =

Bukówka
- Village
- Location within Poland
- Coordinates: 50°57′10″N 21°7′44″E
- Country: Poland
- Voivodeship: Świętokrzyskie
- County: Starachowice
- Gmina: Pawłów
- Population: 280

Bukówka [buˈkufka] is a village in the administrative district of Gmina Pawłów, within Starachowice County, Świętokrzyskie Voivodeship, in south-central Poland. It lies approximately 3 km (2 mi) south-east of Pawłów, 12 km (7 mi) south of Starachowice, and 37 km (23 mi) east of the regional capital Kielce.
