= Wawrzeńczyce, Świętokrzyskie Voivodeship =

Wawrzeńczyce
- Village
- Location within Poland
- Coordinates: 50°55′49″N 21°6′19″E
- Country: Poland
- Voivodeship: Świętokrzyskie
- County: Starachowice
- Gmina: Pawłów
- Population: 270

Wawrzeńczyce [vavʐɛɲˈt͡ʂɨt͡sɛ] is a village in the administrative district of Gmina Pawłów, within Starachowice County, Świętokrzyskie Voivodeship, in south-central Poland. It lies approximately 5 km (3 mi) south of Pawłów, 14 km (9 mi) south of Starachowice, and 35 km (22 mi) east of the regional capital Kielce.
