= Godów, Świętokrzyskie Voivodeship =

Godów
- Village
- Location within Poland
- Coordinates: 50°57′56″N 21°10′39″E
- Country: Poland
- Voivodeship: Świętokrzyskie
- County: Starachowice
- Gmina: Pawłów
- Population: 510

Godów [ˈɡɔduf] is a village in the administrative district of Gmina Pawłów, within Starachowice County, Świętokrzyskie Voivodeship, in south-central Poland. It lies approximately 5 km (3 mi) east of Pawłów, 13 km (8 mi) south-east of Starachowice, and 41 km (25 mi) east of the regional capital Kielce.
