= Rzepin Pierwszy =

- Village
- Location within Poland
- Coordinates: 50°58′58″N 21°4′33″E
- Country: Poland
- Voivodeship: Świętokrzyskie
- County: Starachowice
- Gmina: Pawłów
- Population: 600

Rzepin Pierwszy [ˈʐɛpin ˈpjɛrfʂɨ] is a village in the administrative district of Gmina Pawłów, within Starachowice County, Świętokrzyskie Voivodeship, in south-central Poland. It lies approximately 3 km (2 mi) north-west of Pawłów, 8 km (5 mi) south of Starachowice, and 35 km (22 mi) east of the regional capital Kielce.
