= Świślina, Świętokrzyskie Voivodeship =

Świślina
- Village
- Location within Poland
- Coordinates: 50°58′5″N 21°2′25″E
- Country: Poland
- Voivodeship: Kieleckie
- County: Starachowice
- Gmina: Pawłów
- Population: 340

Świślina [ɕfiˈɕlina] is a village in the administrative district of Gmina Pawłów, within Starachowice County, Świętokrzyskie Voivodeship, in south-central Poland. It lies approximately 5 km (3 mi) west of Pawłów, 10 km (6 mi) south of Starachowice, and 32 km (20 mi) east of the regional capital Kielce.
