= Bukówka =

Bukówka may refer to the following settlements in Poland:

- Bukówka, Lower Silesian Voivodeship (south-west Poland)
- Bukówka, Świętokrzyskie Voivodeship (south-central Poland)
- Bukówka, Pomeranian Voivodeship (north Poland)
