= Jeleniowska Landscape Park =

Protected area in Poland

Coordinates: 50.8281°N 21.1714°E

- Jeleniowski Park Krajobrazowy
- IUCN category V (protected landscape/seascape)
- Interactive map of Jeleniowska Landscape Park
- Location: Świętokrzyskie Voivodeship
- Area: 42.95 km^{2} (16.58 sq mi)

Jeleniowska Landscape Park (Jeleniowski Park Krajobrazowy) is a protected area (Landscape Park) in south-central Poland, covering an area of 42.95 square kilometres (16.58 sq mi).

The Park lies within Świętokrzyskie Voivodeship: in Kielce County (Gmina Łagów, Gmina Nowa Słupia), Opatów County (Gmina Baćkowice, Gmina Sadowie), Ostrowiec County (Gmina Waśniów) and Starachowice County (Gmina Pawłów).

The park covers the Jeleniowskie range and the river valleys of Dobruchna and Pokrzywianka; its total surface area is 11,350 acres. Mountain forests and mixed mountain forests with predominance of Carpathian beech stands occupy nearly two thirds of the whole park's territory.
