= Godów =

Godów may refer to the following places in Poland:

- Godów, Lublin Voivodeship (east Poland)
- Godów, Silesian Voivodeship (south Poland)
- Godów, Świętokrzyskie Voivodeship (south-central Poland)
