= Wawrzeńczyce =

Wawrzeńczyce may refer to the following places in Poland:

- Wawrzeńczyce, Lower Silesian Voivodeship (south-west Poland)
- Wawrzeńczyce, Lesser Poland Voivodeship (south Poland)
- Wawrzeńczyce, Świętokrzyskie Voivodeship (south-central Poland)
