= Gmina Pawłów =

Gmina Pawłów Pawłów Commune
- Gmina
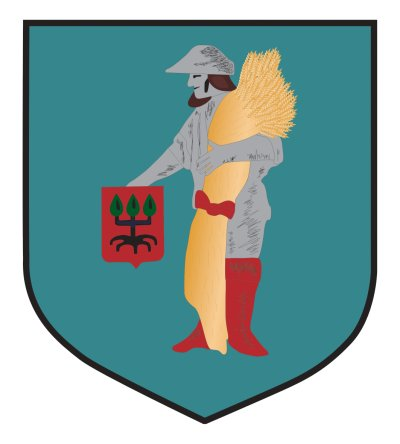
- Coat of arms
- Interactive map of Gmina Pawłów
- Coordinates (Pawłów): 50°57′59″N 21°6′35″E
- Country: Poland
- Voivodeship: Świętokrzyskie
- County: Starachowice
- Seat: Pawłów

Area
  - Total: 137.39 km^{2} (53.05 sq mi)

Population (2006)
  - Total: 15,064
  - Density: 109.64/km^{2} (283.98/sq mi)
- Website: http://www.gmina-pawlow.pl

Gmina Pawłów is a rural gmina (administrative district) in Starachowice County, Świętokrzyskie Voivodeship, in south-central Poland. Its seat is the village of Pawłów, which lies approximately 10 kilometres (6 mi) south of Starachowice and 36 km (22 mi) east of the regional capital Kielce.

The gmina covers an area of 137.39 square kilometres (53.0 sq mi), and as of 2006 its total population is 15,064.

The gmina contains parts of the protected areas called Jeleniowska Landscape Park and Sieradowice Landscape Park.

== Villages ==
Gmina Pawłów contains the villages and settlements of Ambrożów, Bronkowice, Brzezie, Bukówka, Chybice, Dąbrowa, Godów, Grabków, Jadowniki, Kałków, Krajków, Łomno, Modrzewie, Nieczulice, Nowy Bostów, Nowy Jawor, Pawłów, Pokrzywnica, Radkowice, Radkowice-Kolonia, Rzepin Drugi, Rzepin Pierwszy, Rzepin-Kolonia, Rzepinek, Stary Bostów, Stary Jawor, Świętomarz, Świślina, Szeligi, Szerzawy, Tarczek, Trzeszków, Warszówek, Wawrzeńczyce, Wieloborowice and Zbrza.

== Neighbouring gminas ==
Gmina Pawłów is bordered by the town of Starachowice and by the gminas of Bodzentyn, Brody, Kunów, Nowa Słupia, Wąchock and Waśniów and Mests (suburb of Waśniów).
