= Gmina Mirzec =

Gmina Mirzec Mirzec Commune
- Gmina
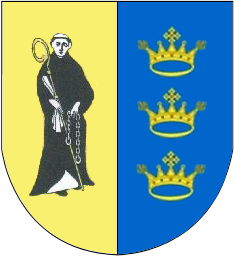
- Flag Coat of arms
- Interactive map of Gmina Mirzec
- Coordinates (Mirzec): 51°8′4″N 21°3′23″E
- Country: Poland
- Voivodeship: Świętokrzyskie
- County: Starachowice
- Seat: Mirzec

Area
  - Total: 110.98 km^{2} (42.85 sq mi)

Population (2006)
  - Total: 8,456
  - Density: 76.19/km^{2} (197.3/sq mi)
- Website: http://www.mirzec.pl

Gmina Mirzec is a rural gmina (administrative district) in Starachowice County, Świętokrzyskie Voivodeship, in south-central Poland. Its seat is the village of Mirzec, which lies approximately 10 kilometres (6 mi) north of Starachowice and 42 km (26 mi) north-east of the regional capital Kielce.

The gmina covers an area of 110.98 square kilometres (42.8 sq mi), and as of 2006 its total population is 8,456.

== Villages ==
Gmina Mirzec contains the villages and settlements of Gadka, Jagodne, Krupów, Krzewa, Małyszyn Dolny, Małyszyn Górny, Mirzec, Osiny, Ostrożanka, Trębowiec Duży, Trębowiec Mały, Tychów Nowy and Tychów Stary.

== Neighbouring gminas ==
Gmina Mirzec is bordered by the gminas of Brody, Iłża, Mirów, Skarżysko Kościelne, Wąchock and Wierzbica.
