= Włodzimierz Puchalski =

Polish photographer and film director

Włodzimierz Puchalski (March 6, 1909 – January 19, 1979) was a Polish photographer and film director. He was a pioneer of wildlife film-making in Poland and became famous for publishing his album "Bezkrwawe łowy" (or bloodless hunting) in 1954.

== Life ==
Puchalski was born in Velyki Mosty, near Lwów (then in Austria-Hungary, now Lviv in Ukraine). His father Władysław Puchalski owned an estate with Katarzyna née Sykora. His first experience with cameras began when his maternal grandfather Hieronim Sykora gifted him a wooden camera. An uncle Antoni Sykora was an expert on the birds and nature and accompanied young Puchalski in the outdoors. He spent endless hours taking pictures of animals, flowers and landscapes. He studied at the Politechnika Lwowska to become an agronomic engineer. He began his photographic career while in the Cadet Corps and during his college studies, initially photographing waterfowl in the fish ponds at Żółkiew (Zhovkva) from hides made of grass, and, later, carnivorous birds in Sokal. A friend, Tadeusz Chrzanowski (1926–2006), invited him to their family estate in Moroczyn. While on this visit, he was captivated by Edward's stepmother, Izabela (1900–1956). Puchalski assisted Witold Romer in 1933 on photochemistry and exhibited a set of photographs in 1936 and won awards in 1937 at the World Hunting Exhibition in Berlin. He worked also as an assistant to Kazimierz Wodzicki. He also recorded hunting scenes of the Polish nobility. He used the term "bloodless hunt" to describe hunting wildlife with a camera.

During World War II, he joined as an artillery lieutenant in 1939 and saw action in Lublin and Wołyniu. He was captured but managed to escape and from 1940 to 1944 he was taken prisoner, from which he managed to escape. In the years 1940–1944 he worked as a forest ranger in the Brzóza estate in Sandomierz, working alongside the partisans. During the war, Izabela's husband Wincenty Chrzanów died and Puchalski married her on September 5, 1945. The couple then began to travel and make nature films together. In 1946, he joined forces with the Łódź educational film company Wytwórnia Filmów Oświatowych w Łodzi and, travelling throughout Poland, took photographs of nature subjects: flocks of migratory birds on the Biebrza and Narew rivers, as well as wisent, elk, wolves, lynx, beavers, deer and smaller animals. His first film was on bird island. He resigned from the company in 1950 partly because there were objections to the work team consisting of him, Izabela and Tadeusz (friend and since 1945 technically stepson) but rejoined it in 1956 after the death of his wife Izabela.

On Spitsbergen, he gathered substantive material about the fauna of the archipelago; in the Polish research station on King George Island in the Antarctic, he photographed penguins, sea lions, whale bones and birds. He died while filming skuas.

== Death ==
Puchalski was assigned to the third polar expedition headed by Stanislaw Rakusa-Suszczewski and arrived at the Henryk Arctowski Polish Antarctic Station in 1978. He died on 19 January 1979 while working at the station and was buried on a hill to the south of the station.

== Film festival ==
The Włodzimierz Puchalski International Nature Film Festival is held yearly in Łódź in Puchalski's honour.
