= Mirzec =

- Village
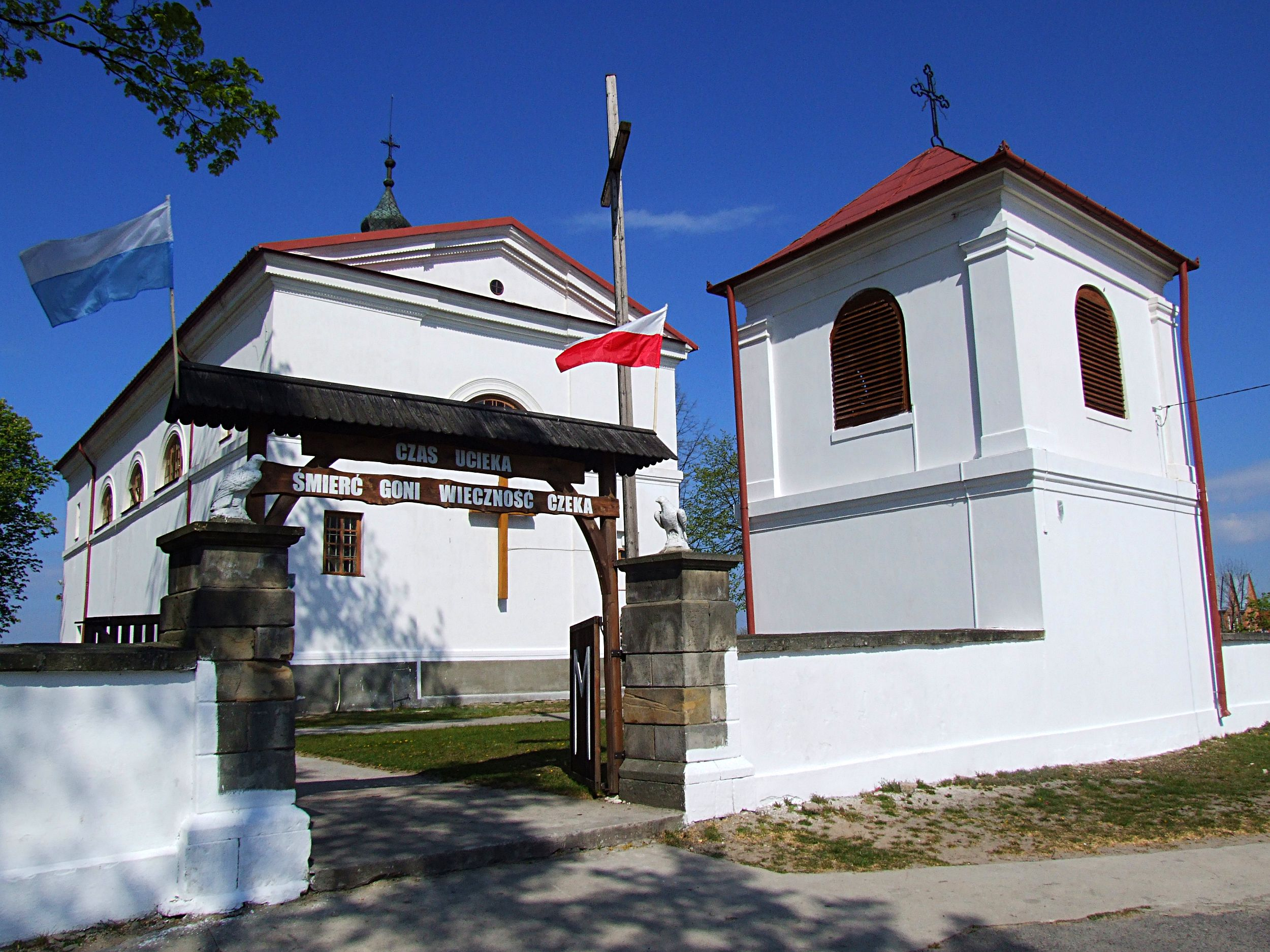
- Saint Leonard Church

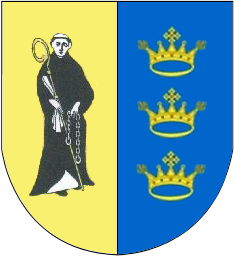
- Coat of arms

- Location within Poland
- Coordinates: 51°8′4″N 21°3′23″E
- Country: Poland
- Voivodeship: Świętokrzyskie
- County: Starachowice
- Gmina: Mirzec
- Population: 2,100

Mirzec [ˈmiʐɛt͡s] is a village in Starachowice County, Świętokrzyskie Voivodeship, in south-central Poland. It is the seat of the gmina (administrative district) called Gmina Mirzec. It lies approximately 10 km (6 mi) north of Starachowice and 42 km (26 mi) north-east of the regional capital Kielce.

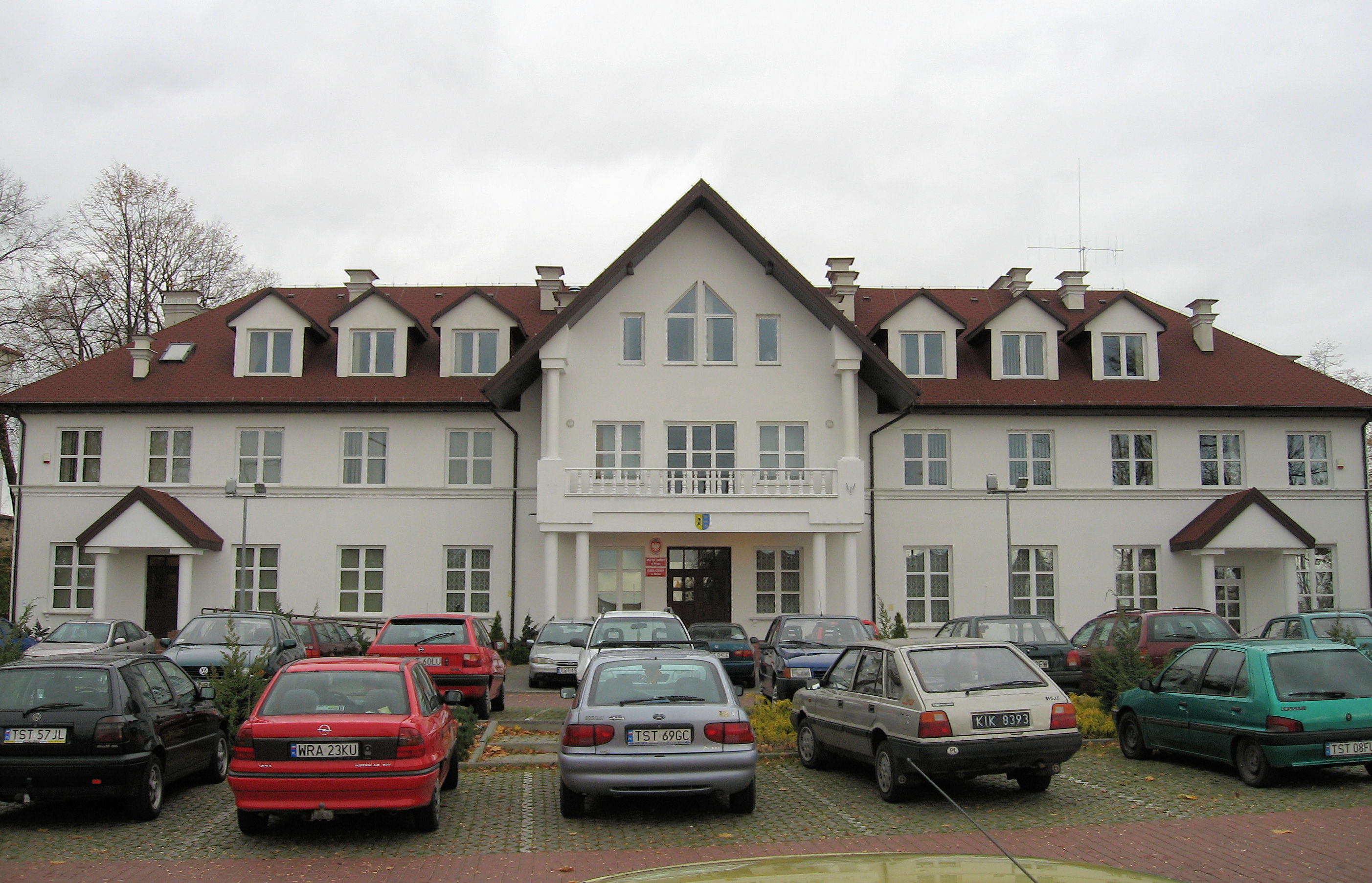
Commune office in Mirzec
