= Pawłów, Starachowice County =

Pawłów
- Village
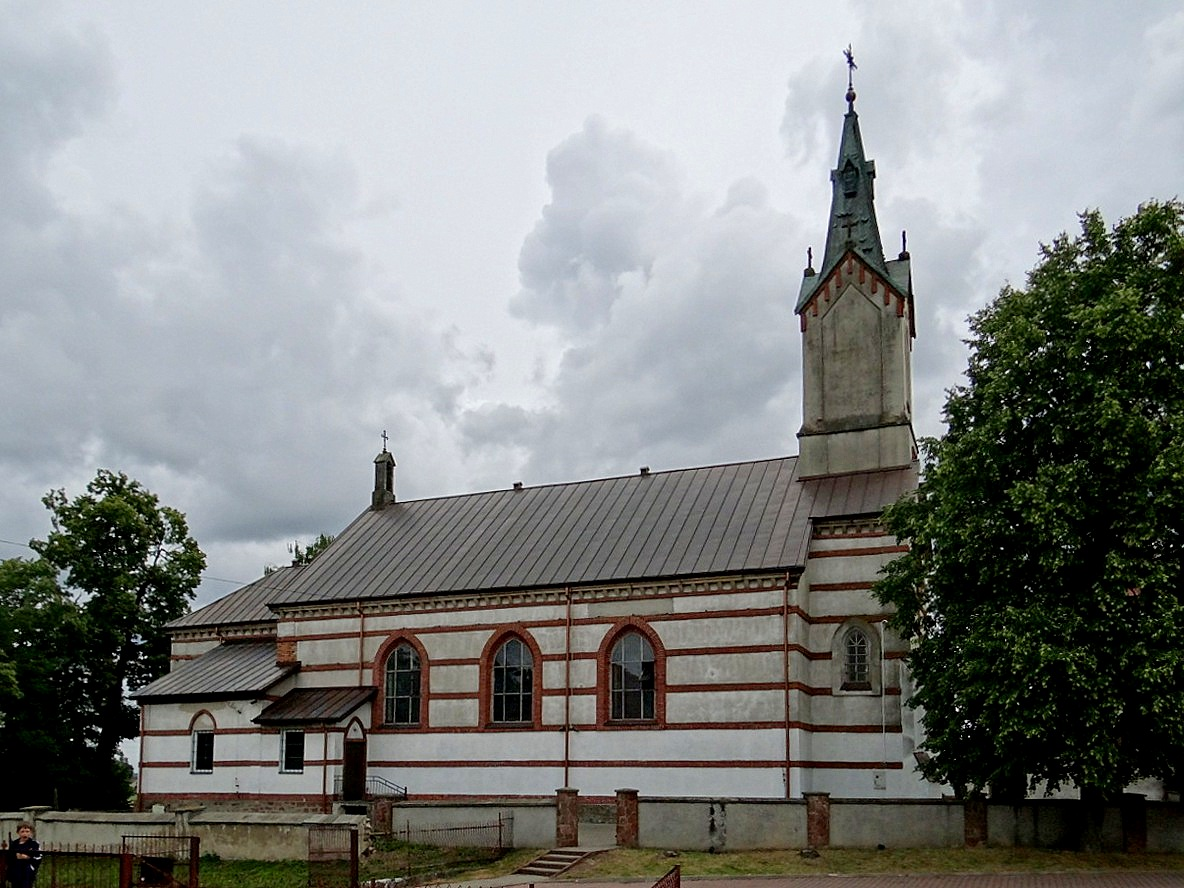
- Church of Saint John the Baptist

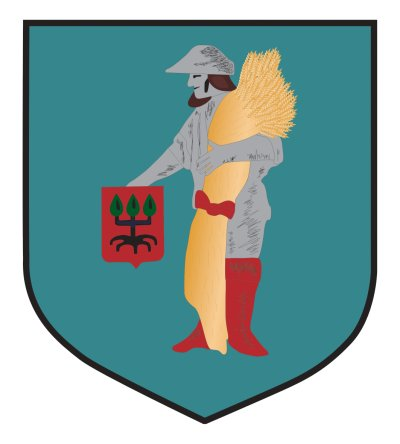
- Coat of arms

- Location within Poland
- Coordinates: 50°57′59″N 21°6′35″E
- Country: Poland
- Voivodeship: Świętokrzyskie
- County: Starachowice
- Gmina: Pawłów

Population
  - Total: 1,100

Pawłów [ˈpavwuf] is a village in Starachowice County, Świętokrzyskie Voivodeship, in south-central Poland. It is the seat of the gmina (administrative district) called Gmina Pawłów. It lies approximately 10 km (6 mi) south of Starachowice and 36 km (22 mi) east of the regional capital Kielce.
