= Starachowice County =

Starachowice County Powiat starachowicki
- County
- Flag Coat of arms

- Location within the voivodeship
- Coordinates (Starachowice): 51°3′N 21°4′E
- Country: Poland
- Voivodeship: Świętokrzyskie
- Seat: Starachowice
- Gminas: Total 5 (incl. 1 urban): Starachowice; Gmina Brody; Gmina Mirzec; Gmina Pawłów; Gmina Wąchock

Area
  - Total: 523.27 km^{2} (202.04 sq mi)

Population (2019)
  - Total: 89,925
  - Density: 171.85/km^{2} (445.09/sq mi)
  - Urban: 51,412
  - Rural: 38,513
- Car plates: TST
- Website: www.powiat.starachowice.pl

Starachowice County (Polish: powiat starachowicki) is a unit of territorial administration and local government (powiat) in Świętokrzyskie Voivodeship, south-central Poland. It came into being on January 1, 1999, as a result of the Polish local government reforms passed in 1998. Its administrative seat and largest town is Starachowice, which lies 37 kilometres (23 mi) north-east of the regional capital Kielce. The only other town in the county is Wąchock, lying 5 km (3 mi) north-west of Starachowice.

The county covers an area of 523.27 square kilometres (202.0 sq mi). As of 2019 its total population is 89,925, out of which the population of Starachowice is 48,646, that of Wąchock is 2,766, and the rural population is 38,513.

== Neighbouring counties ==
Starachowice County is bordered by Radom County to the north, Lipsko County and Ostrowiec County to the east, Kielce County to the west, and Skarżysko County and Szydłowiec County to the north-west.

== Administrative divisions ==
The county is subdivided into five gminas (one urban, one urban-rural and three rural). These are listed in the following table, in descending order of population.

Gmina	Type	Area (km^{2})	Population (2019)	Seat
Starachowice	urban	31.9	48,646	
Gmina Pawłów	rural	137.4	15,272	Pawłów
Gmina Brody	rural	161.3	10,911	Brody
Gmina Mirzec	rural	111.0	8,294	Mirzec
Gmina Wąchock	urban-rural	81.8	6,802	Wąchock
