= Starachowice =

City in Świętokrzyskie Voivodeship, Poland

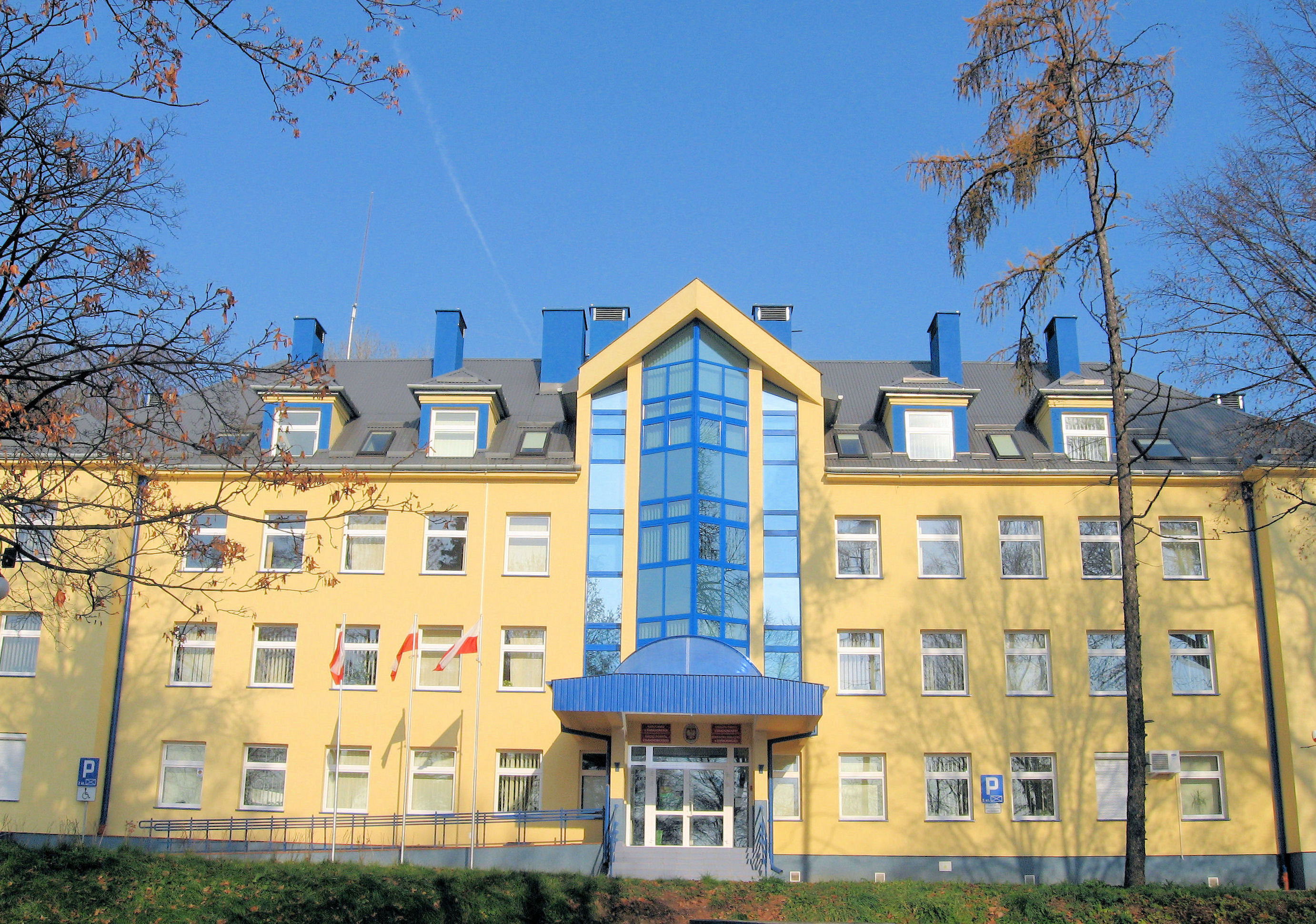
- County administration building

- Flag Coat of arms

- Location within Poland Location within Świętokrzyskie Voivodeship
- Coordinates: 51°3′N 21°4′E
- Country: Poland
- Voivodeship: Świętokrzyskie
- County: Starachowice County
- Gmina: Starachowice (urban gmina)
- Established: 15th century
- City rights: 1624 as Wierzbnik

Government
  - City Mayor: Marek Materek (NDT)

Area
  - Total: 31.85 km^{2} (12.30 sq mi)
- Elevation: 252 m (827 ft)

Population (31.12.2017)
  - Total: 49,513
  - Density: 1,555/km^{2} (4,026/sq mi)
- Time zone: UTC+1 (CET)
  - Summer (DST): UTC+2 (CEST)
- Postal code: 27-200
- Area code: +48 41
- Vehicle registration: TST
- Website: www.um.starachowice.pl

Starachowice [staraxɔˈvʲit͡sɛ] is a city in southeastern Poland (historic Lesser Poland), with 49,513 inhabitants (31.12.2017). It is the capital of Starachowice County in the Świętokrzyskie Voivodeship. It is situated upon the River Kamienna, a tributary of the Vistula River, among hills and forests.

== History ==
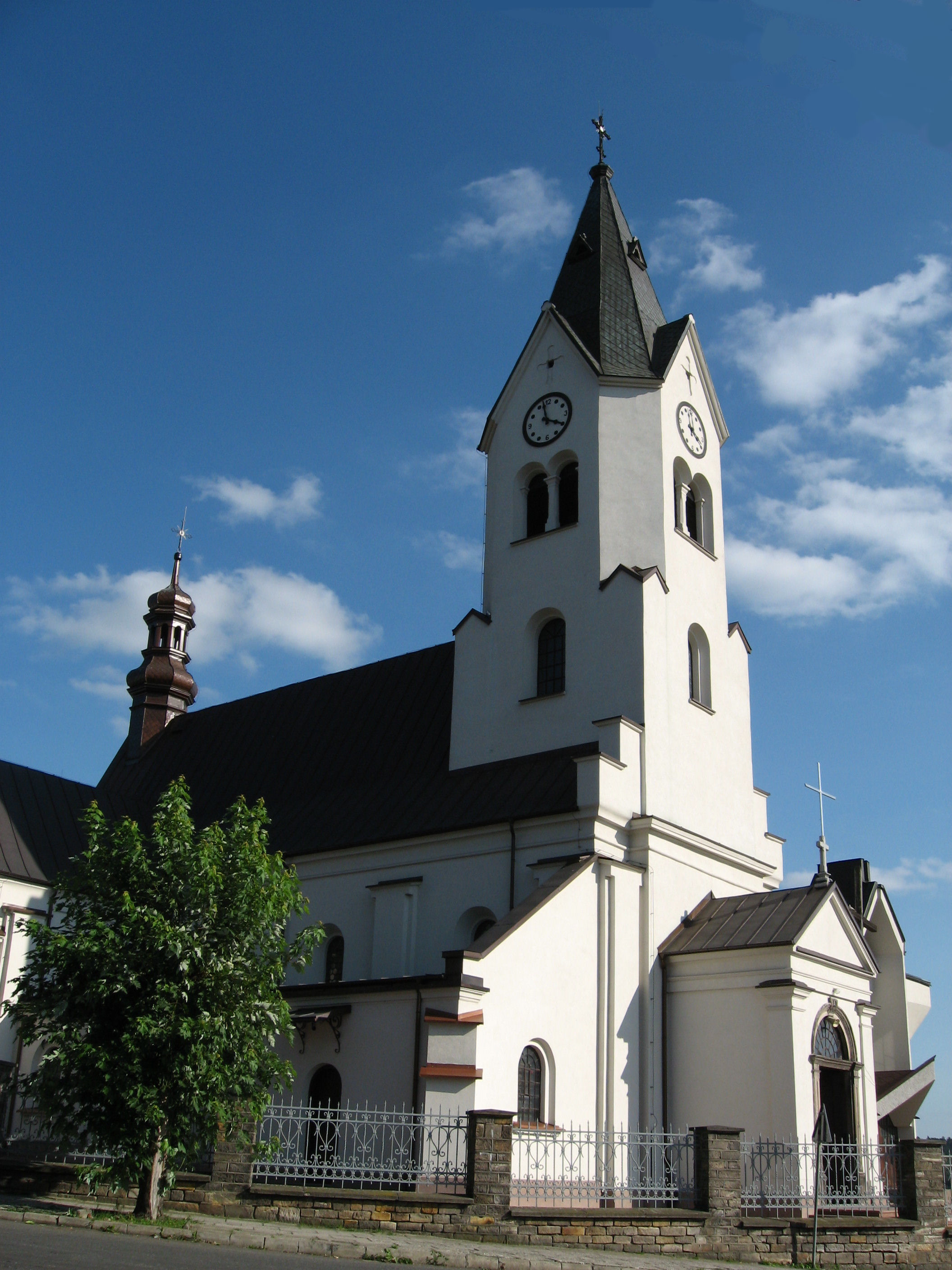
Holy Trinity church which dates back to the 17th century

In the location of present-day Starachowice, a forge existed, which in the 16th century belonged to the Starzechowski family (most probably, the name of the town comes from this family). The oldest known mention of Starachowice comes from 1547. The settlement, which was built around the forge, belonged until 1817 to the Cistercians from Wąchock Abbey, located nearby. It was the monks who in 1789 initiated construction of a blast furnace (see also Old-Polish Industrial Region). In the meantime Polish bishop Bogusław Radoszewski founded the town of Wierzbnik in 1624, which was granted town rights by Polish King Sigismund III Vasa. Three annual fairs and three weekly markets were organized in the town, however it developed slowly, while Starachowice developed faster. Both settlements were administratively located in the Sandomierz Voivodeship in the Lesser Poland Province.

In the Third Partition of Poland, in 1795, the area was annexed by Austria, in 1809 it passed to the short-lived Polish Duchy of Warsaw, and in 1815 it passed to so-called Congress Poland in the Russian Partition of Poland. In 1815, the furnace was taken over by the government of Congress Poland, and in the following years, the industrial settlement of Starachowice emerged as main center of metallurgy. According to a plan devised by Stanisław Staszic, metal industry was developed along the Kamienna river, and the settlement of Starachowice was its center. As part of anti-Polish repressions following the unsuccessful Polish January Uprising, the Russian administration stripped Wierzbnik of its town rights in 1870, which were restored in 1916.

After Poland regained independence in 1918, the government in Warsaw decided to build an arms factory in Starachowice. On October 12, 1920, The Society of Starachowice Mining Company signed a contract with Main Office of Supplying the Army. Soon afterwards, works on construction of artillery ammunition factory began. Zakłady Starachowickie (Starachowice Works), which was an industrial complex including ammunition factory, artillery equipment factory and iron works, was main Poland’s producer of such materiel. It also manufactured the 75 mm Armata wz.02/26, 105 mm Armata wz. 29, 120 mm Armata wz. 78/09/31, Bofors 40 mm, and Bofors 37 mm guns, used by the Polish Army in 1939. The very town of Starachowice was not created until April 1, 1939, when the ancient town of Wierzbnik was merged with the settlement of Starachowice Fabryczne and the village of Starachowice Górne. At first, the new town was named Starachowice-Wierzbnik, and in 1952 the name was changed into Starachowice.

During the German invasion of Poland, which started World War II, the arms factory was evacuated eastwards on September 6, 1939. Later that same day, the suburb of Wanacja (present-day district of Starachowice) was the site of a battle between German and Polish troops, after which German troops committed a massacre of over 20 Polish civilians. On September 7, German troops entered Starachowice. On September 27, 1939, the Einsatzgruppe II entered the city to commit various crimes against Poles. Afterwards it was occupied by Germany and in 1940 the Germans carried out mass arrests of local Polish intelligentsia. Poles were used as forced labour in the local factory. During the Holocaust, the ghetto in Wierzbnik was liquidated on October 27, 1942, and many of its prisoners were sent to the death camp Treblinka. The remaining Jewish residents of Starachowice and Wierzbnik were sent to German labor camps in the vicinity. Those camps were liquidated in the summer of 1944. The remaining survivors were deported to Auschwitz where many were murdered by the Schutzstaffel. There was a munition plant there where Jewish slave labor was used. In 1944, during and following the Warsaw Uprising, the Germans deported thousands of Varsovians from the Dulag 121 camp in Pruszków, where they were initially imprisoned, to Starachowice. Those Poles were mainly old people, ill people and women with children. 10,000 Poles expelled from Warsaw stayed in the town, as of 1 November 1944.

During World War II, Starachowice was an important center of the Home Army, where units of Jan Piwnik and Antoni Heda operated. Polish workers carried out acts of sabotage in the factories, and those at risk of arrest fled and joined partisan units in the nearby forests. On 7 August 1943, Polish partisans liberated 60 people, including partisans, from German captivity in Starachowice. At least three local Polish boy scouts were killed by the Germans during the war.

After the war, the city prospered as an important industrial center. Besides Starachowice Works, truck producer FSC Star was opened in 1948. A Star truck was used as the basis for the first Popemobile for Pope John Paul II's during his first visit to his home country as Pope of the Roman Catholic Church (1979). When capitalist system was reintroduced in 1989, the situation in Starachowice worsened, and unemployment grew drastically. The city currently has a special economy zone with lower tax rates to help the settlement of new industry.

== Sport ==
There is the Municipal Stadium in the city. Local football teams are:

- Star Starachowice, a football club which for several years played in the Second Division
- Juventa Starachowice - football club

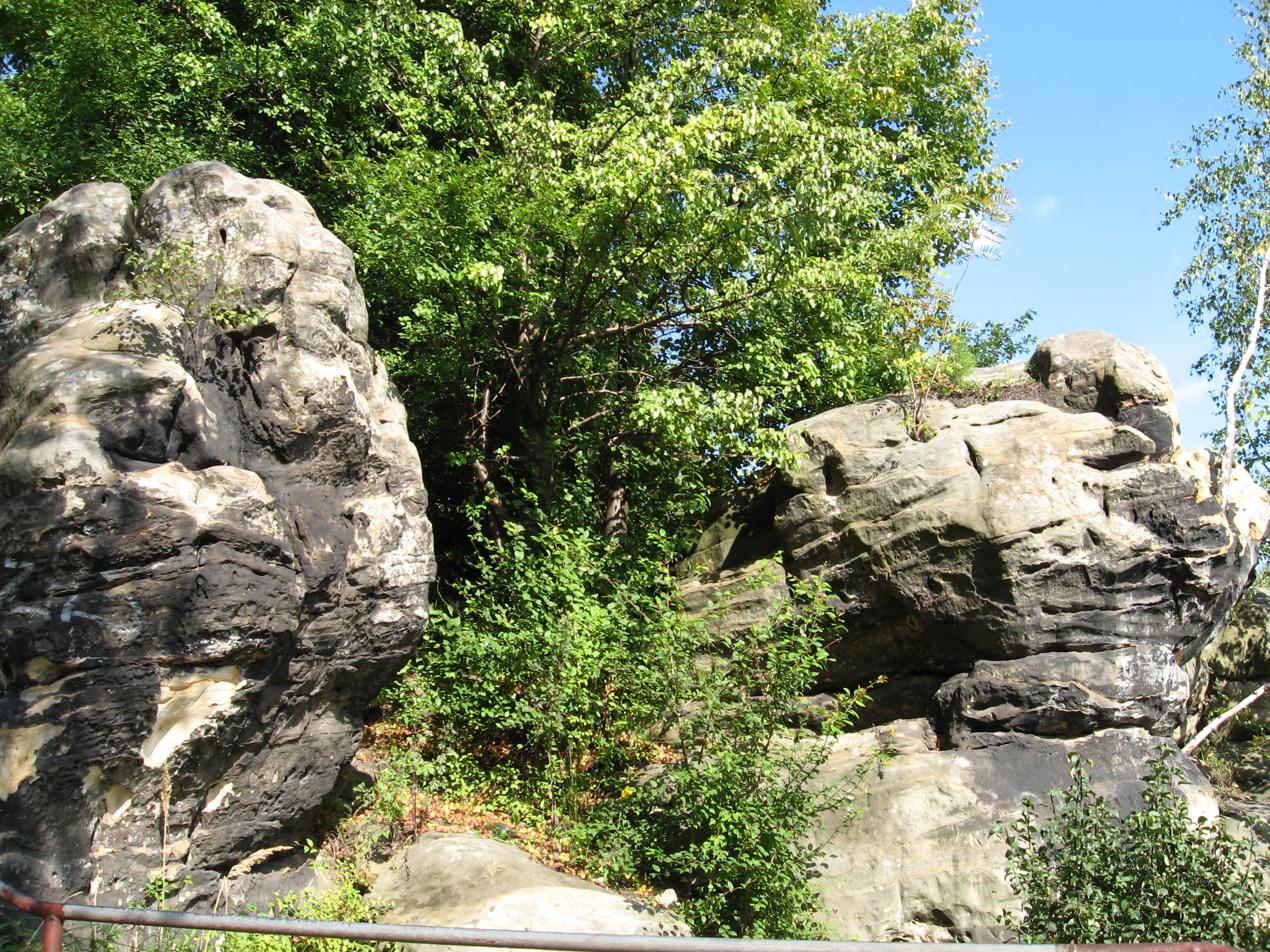
Unique geological denudation - monument to geological features (length- of 400 m, height- 5-8 m)

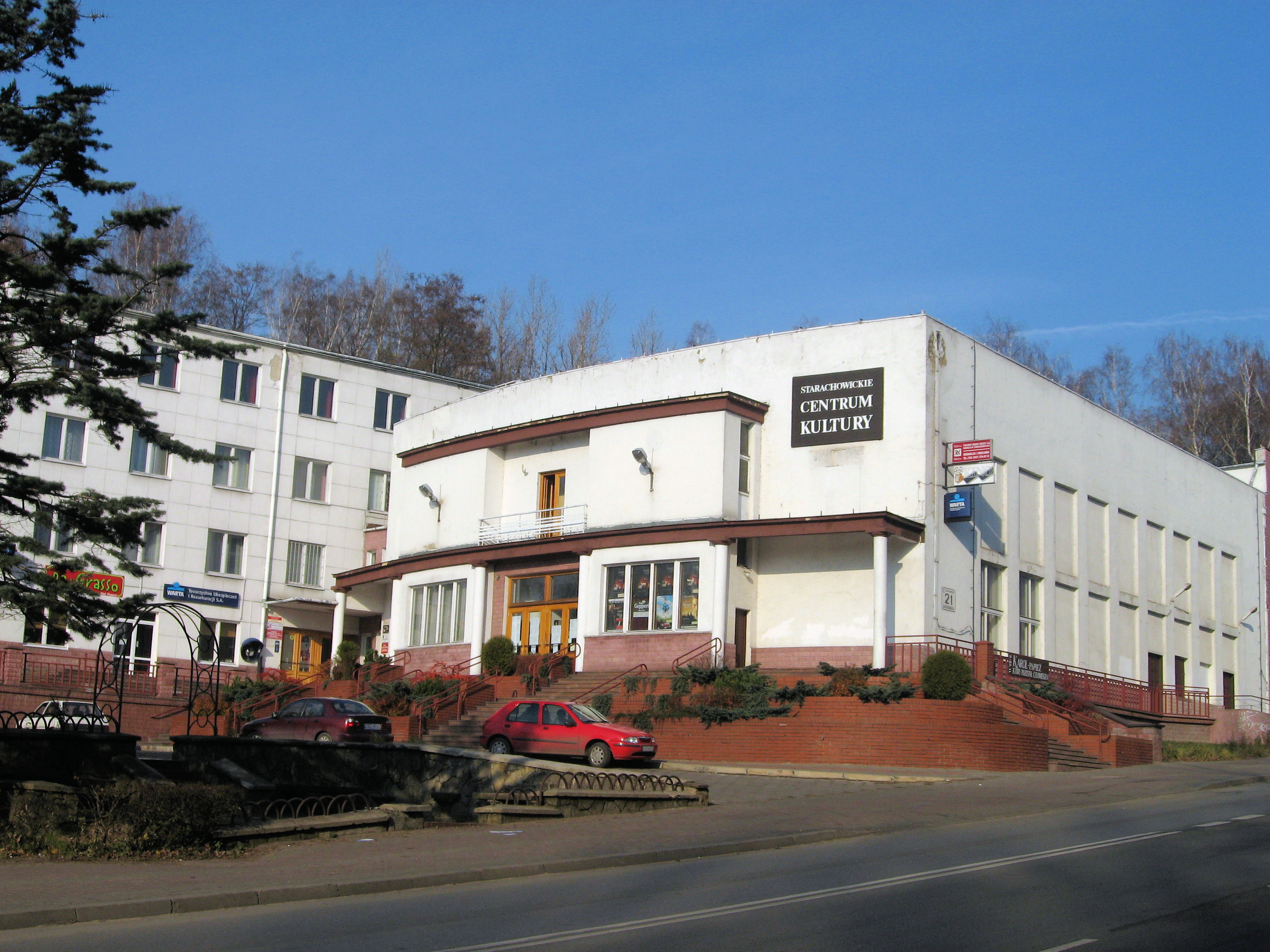
Starachowice Culture Centre

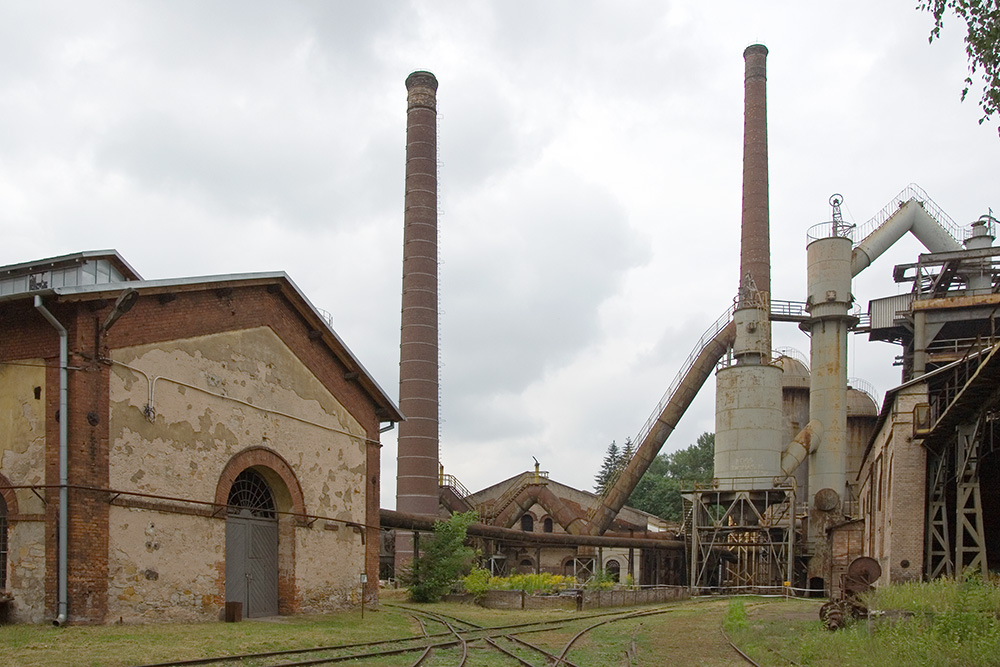
Historic blast-furnace plant, now a museum

== Notable people ==
- Bogusz Bilewski (1930–1995), Polish actor
- Krystyna Janda (born 1952), Polish film and theater actress
- Krzysztof Lipiec (born 1959), Polish politician and member of the Sejm (Polish parliament)
- Rafał Wójcik (born 1972), Polish long-distance runner
- Radosław Majecki (born 1999), Polish professional goalkeeper
- Adrian Gunia (born 2000), Polish kickboxer

== International relations ==
=== Twin towns — Sister cities ===
Starachowice is twinned with:

Aurich, Germany; (United Kingdom) Rochdale-Heywood, Great Britain; Schweinfurt, Germany; Skövde, Sweden; Vechta, Germany	Giżycko, Poland; Candelo, Italy; Almonacid de la Cuba, Spain; La Roche-sur-Foron, France
