= Kurozwęki =

- Village
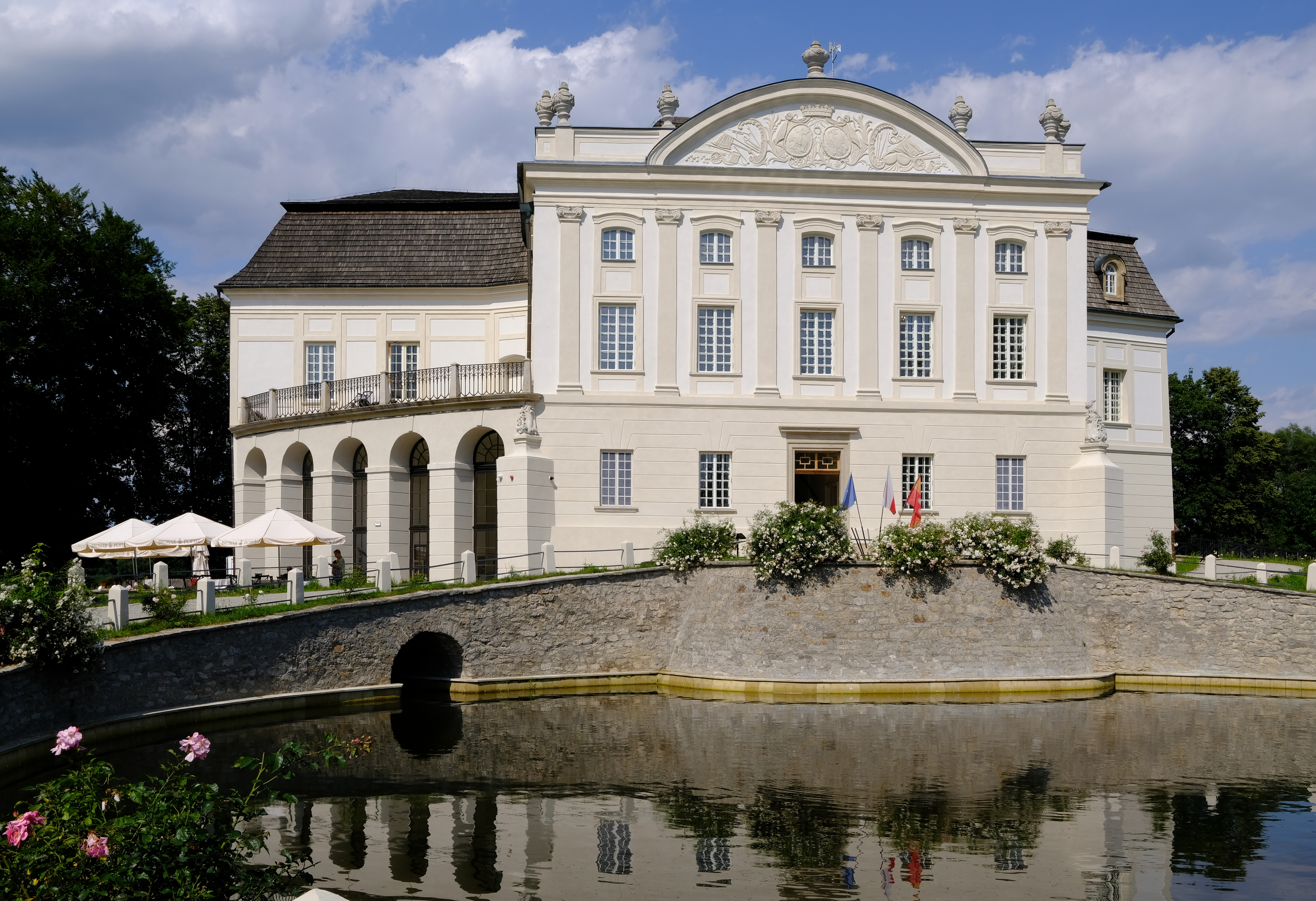
- Kurozwęki Palace

- Coat of arms

- Location within Poland
- Coordinates: 50°35′24″N 21°06′08″E
- Country: Poland
- Voivodeship: Świętokrzyskie
- County: Staszów
- Gmina: Staszów
- Sołectwo: Kurozwęki
- Elevation: 225.6 m (740 ft)

Population (31 December 2009 at Census)
  - Total: 767
- Time zone: UTC+1 (CET)
  - Summer (DST): UTC+2 (CEST)
- Postal code: 28–200
- Area code: +48 15
- Car plates: TSZ

Kurozwęki [kurɔˈzvɛnki] is a village in the district of Gmina Staszów, within Staszów County, Świętokrzyskie Voivodeship, in south-central Poland. It lies on the Czarna Staszowska river, in the historic province of Lesser Poland, approximately 6 km (4 mi) north-west of Staszów and 48 km (30 mi) south-east of the regional capital Kielce.

The village's history dates back to the 13th century. It had city rights from before 1400 to 1870. It has several tourist attractions, including a 14th-century palace, open for visitors, with a bison farm nearby, and a 15th-century church.

Some time in the mid 14th century, local knight Dobiesław of Kurozwęki built here a castle, which became the seat of the Kurozwęcki noble family (see szlachta). At first the castle was of defensive character, but in the course of the time it was remodeled several times. It is not known when exactly Kurozwęki received town charter, most probably it happened before the year 1400. The town belonged to several families – the Kurozwęcki, the Lanckoroński, the Potocki and the Popiel. In the 17th century, when Kurozwęki belonged to Lesser Poland's Sandomierz Voivodeship, it was one of the centers of Protestant Reformation, especially Calvinism. In 1870, the government of Russian-controlled Congress Poland (see Partitions of Poland) deprived it of the town charter.

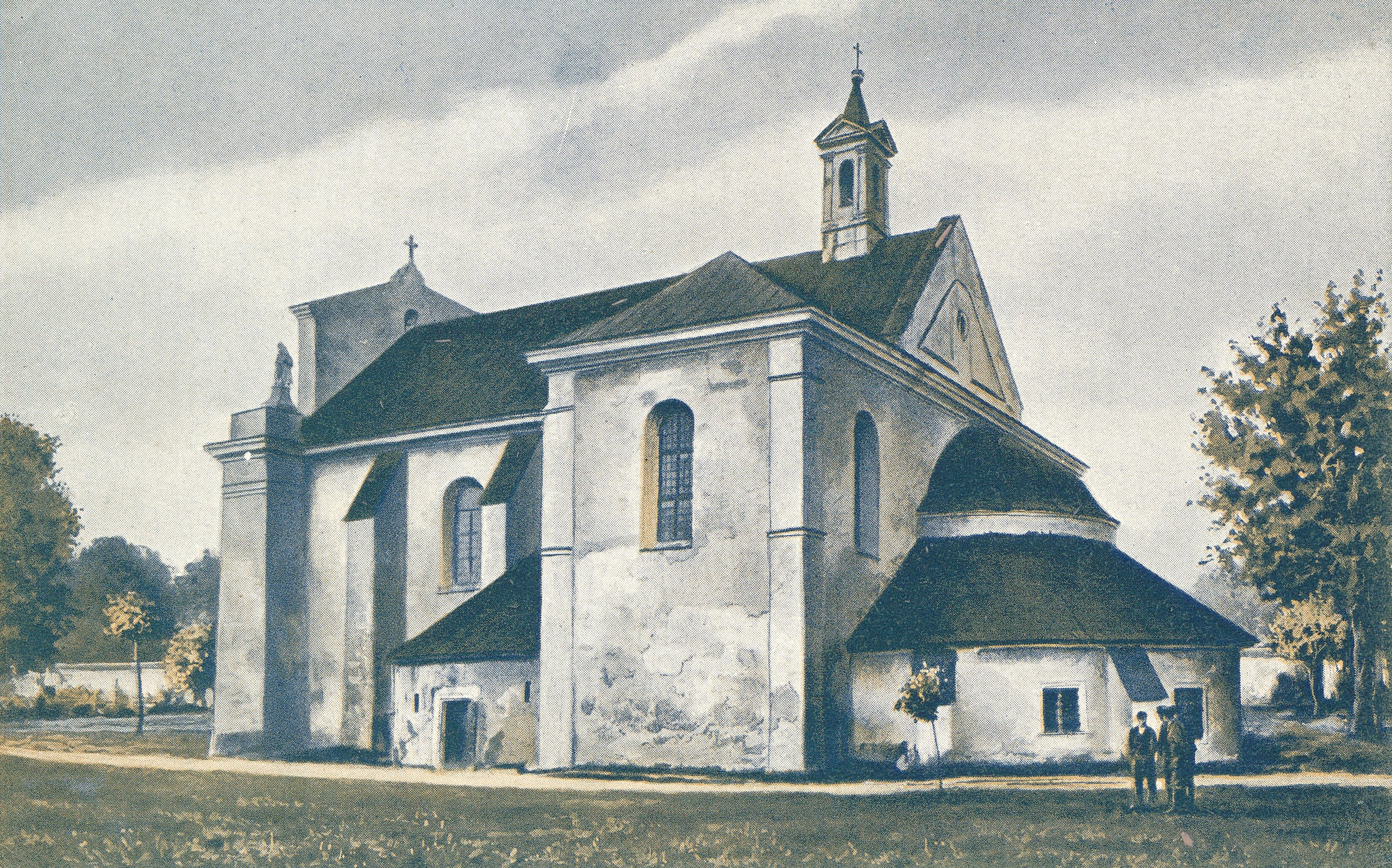
Church of the Assumption of the Virgin Mary, ca 1915

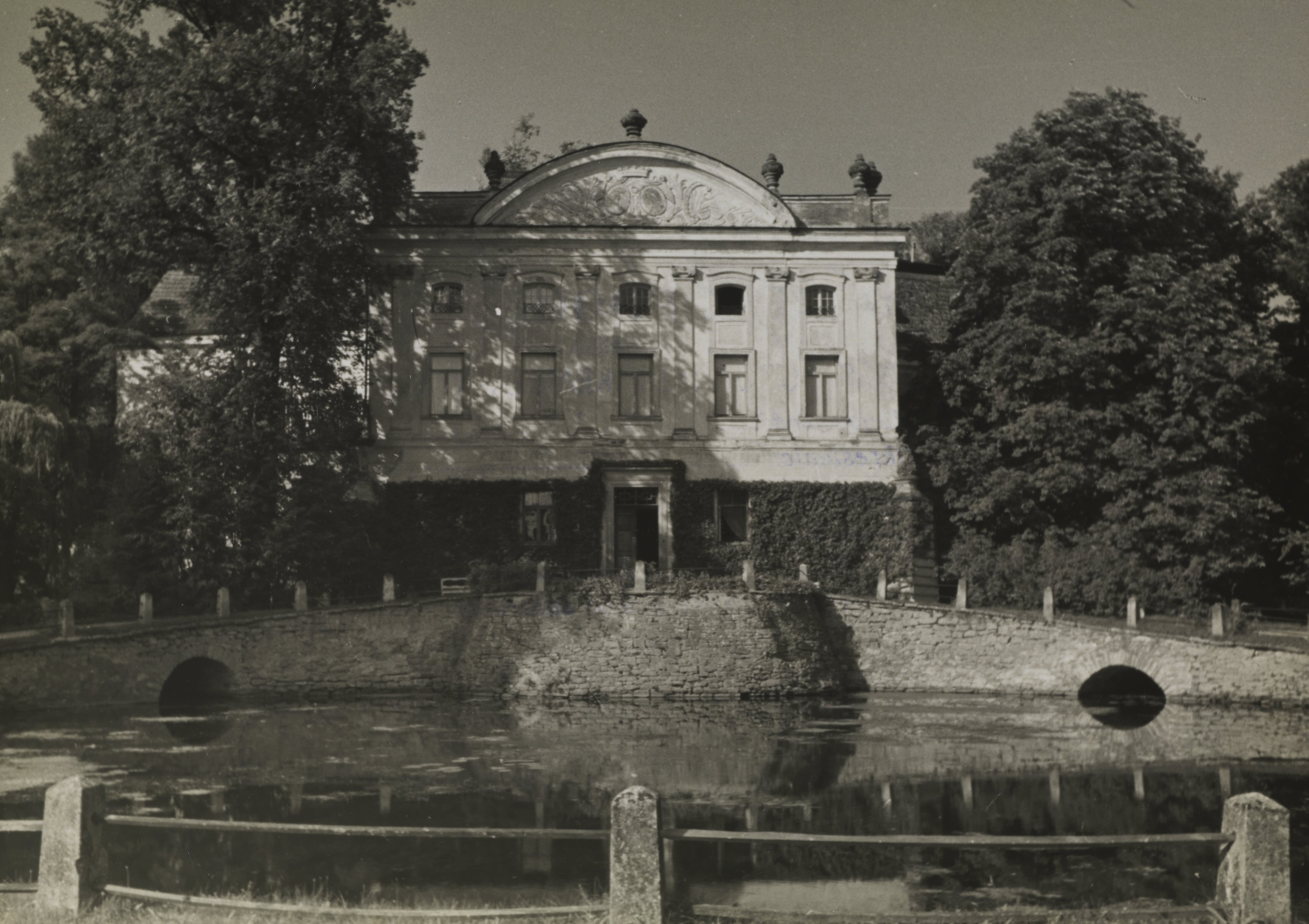
Pałac circa 1936

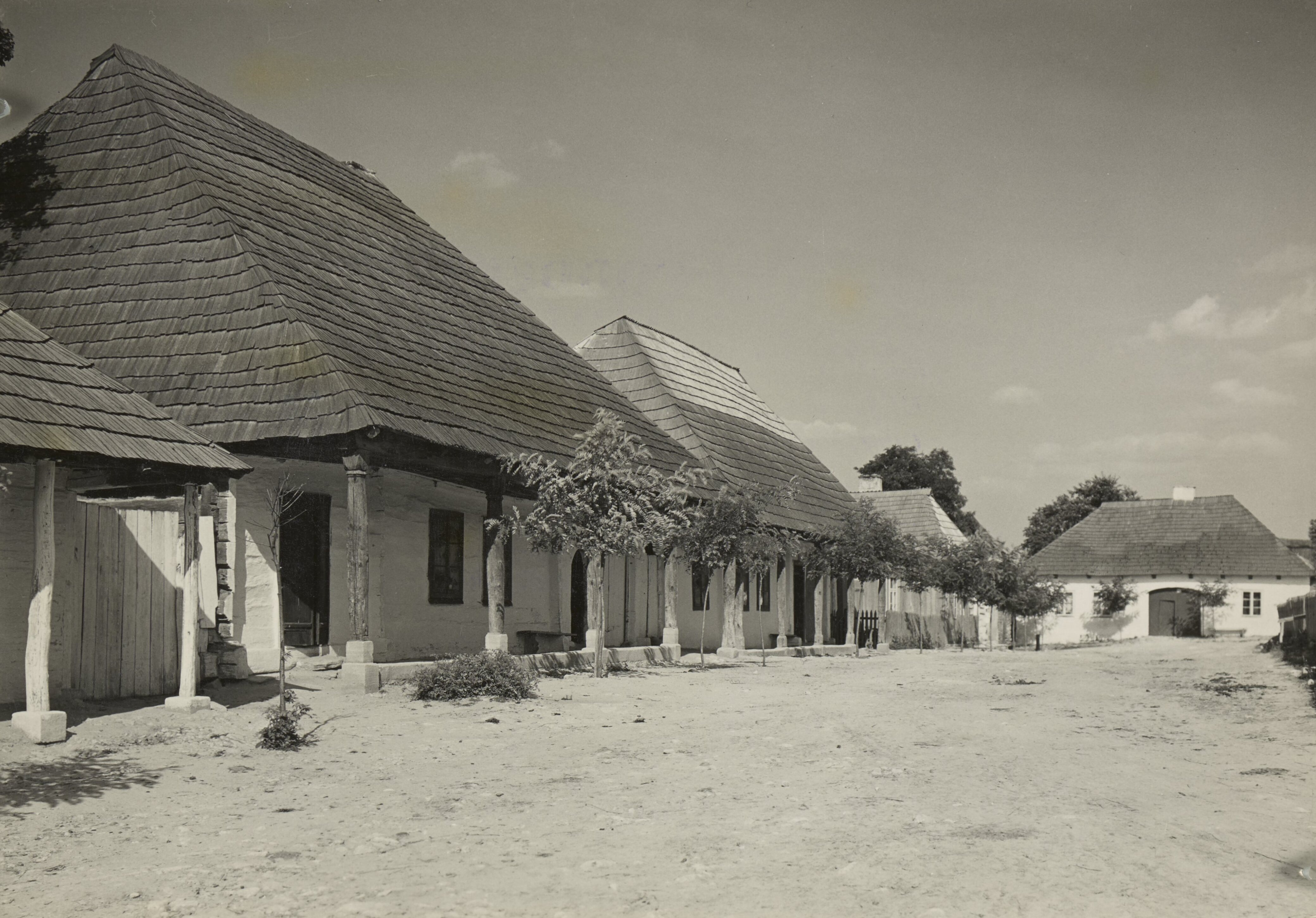
Market square, ca 1936

== See also ==
- Kurozwęki Palace
