= Czyżów Szlachecki Castle =

Castle in Poland

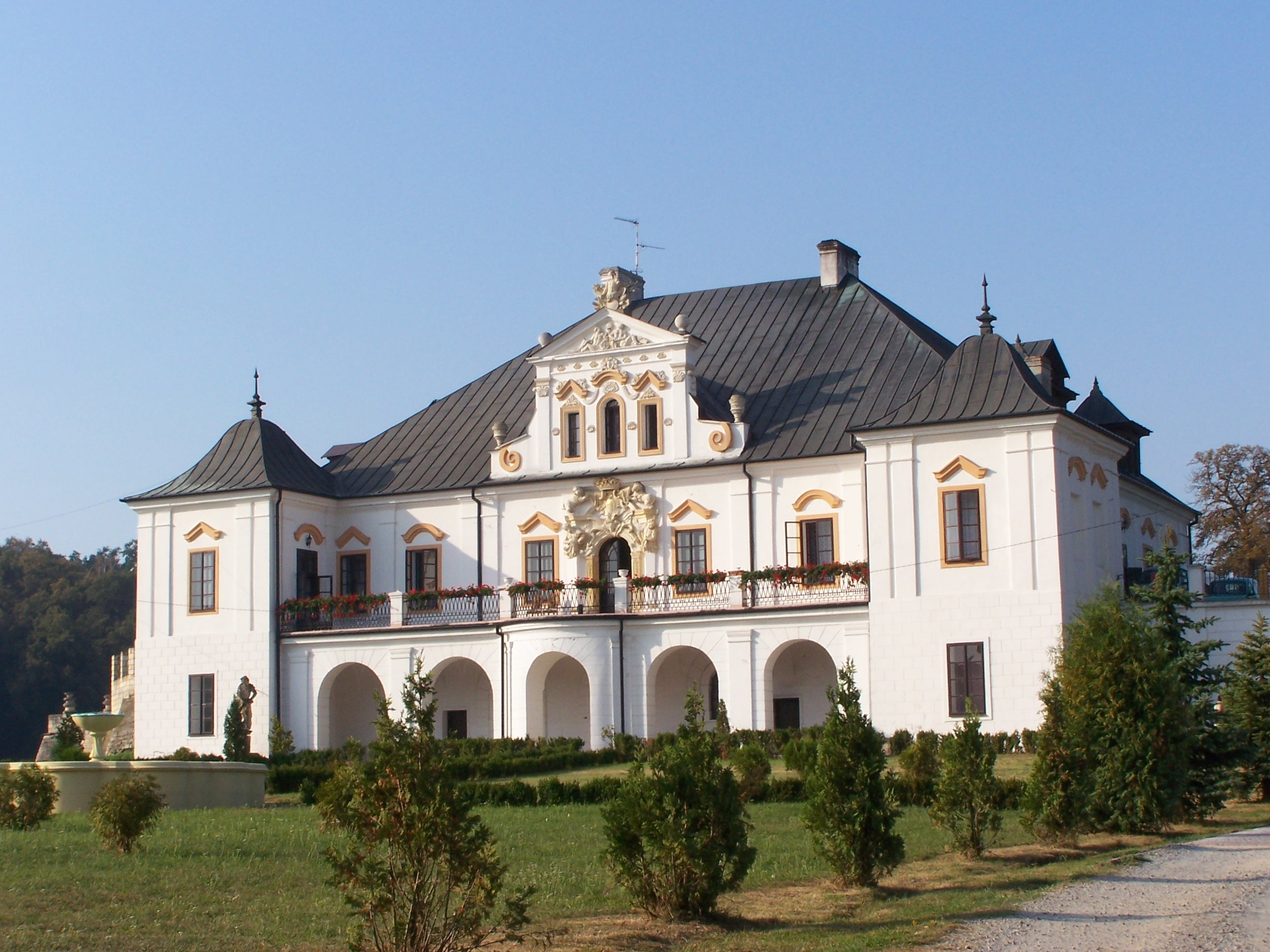
- Czyżów Szlachecki Castle

- Location of the Czyżów Szlachecki Castle in Poland
- 50°49′43″N 21°46′37″E

History
- Built: 18th century

Site notes
- Architectural style: Baroque

Czyżów Szlachecki Castle (Polish: Zamek w Czyżowie Szlacheckim) - a castle located in Czyżów Szlachecki, Świętokrzyskie Voivodeship; in Poland. The current castle is located in the location of the former Czyżowski Castle (from the fifteenth century), whose foundation was used to build the castle. The castle had undergone a restoration in 1978. In 1996, the castle was sold to entrepreneurs from Mielec.

== See also ==
- Castles in Poland
