= List of Polish voivodeships by Human Development Index =

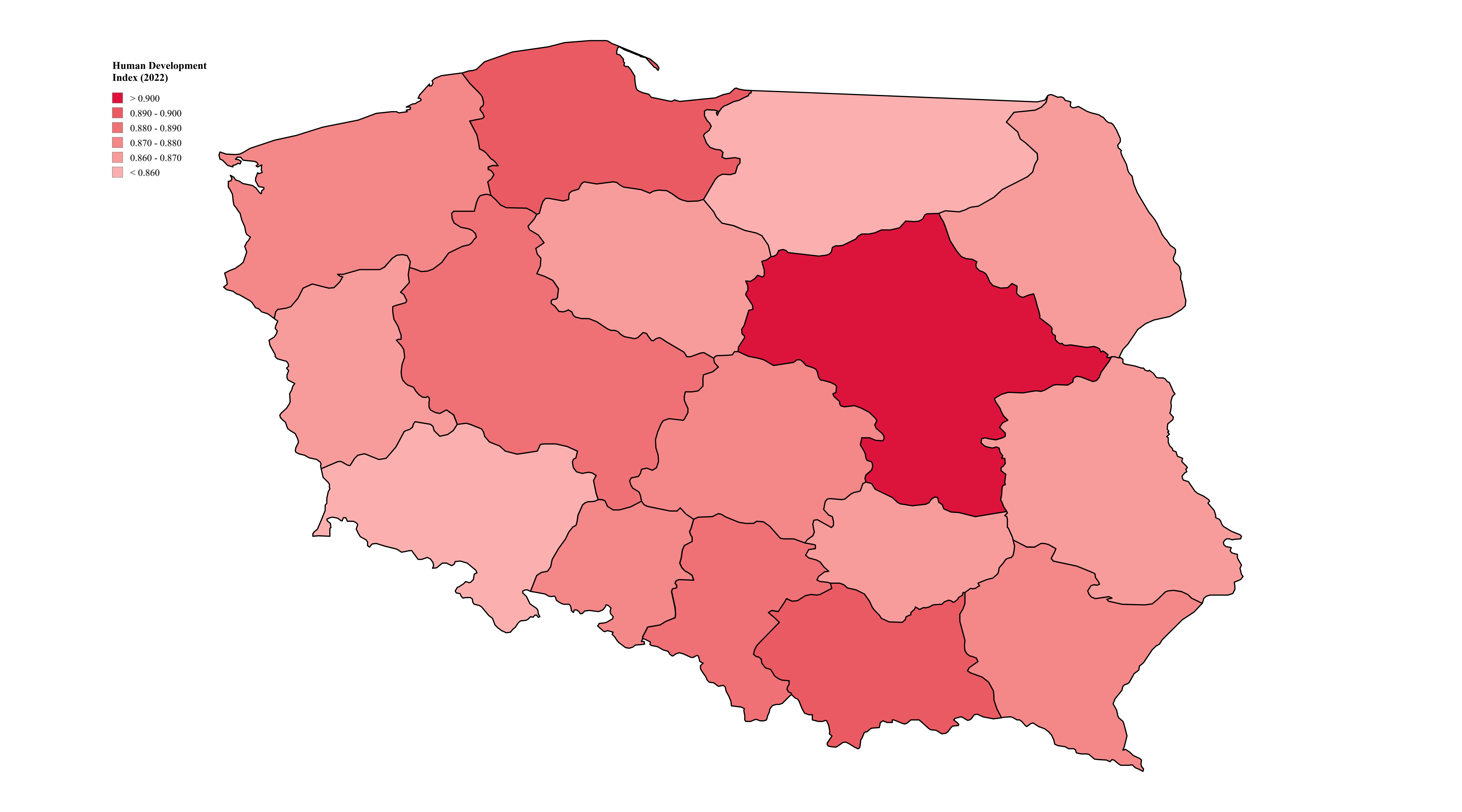
Polish voivodeships by Human Development Index (2022) Legend: > 0.900 0.890 - 0.900 0.880 - 0.890 0.870 - 0.880 0.860 - 0.870 < 0.860

This is a list of the voivodeships of Poland by Human Development Index as of 2023.

Rank	Voivodeship	HDI (2023)
Very high human development
1	Masovian Voivodeship	0.958
2	Lower Silesian Voivodeship	0.929
3	Lesser Poland Voivodeship	0.924
4	Pomeranian Voivodeship	0.919
4	Greater Poland Voivodeship	0.919
6	Silesian Voivodeship	0.910
–	Poland	0.906
7	Łódź Voivodeship	0.901
8	Podlaskie Voivodeship	0.891
9	Opole Voivodeship	0.888
10	Kuyavian-Pomeranian Voivodeship	0.887
11	Lublin Voivodeship	0.886
12	West Pomeranian Voivodeship	0.884
13	Podkarpackie Voivodeship	0.883
14	Świętokrzyskie Voivodeship	0.877
15	Lubusz Voivodeship	0.874
16	Warmian-Masurian Voivodeship	0.862

== Development 1995–2022 ==
This is a list of the voivodeships of Poland by Human Development Index for the years 1995 to 2022, highlighting the development over this period.

Region	1995	2000	2005	2010	2015	2019	2022	Increase 1995–2022
Podlaskie Voivodeship	0.732	0.778	0.800	0.831	0.853	0.873	0.875	▲19.5%
Lower Silesian Voivodeship	0.749	0.794	0.822	0.851	0.875	0.894	0.894	▲19.4%
Masovian Voivodeship	0.781	0.829	0.856	0.886	0.912	0.931	0.931	▲19.2%
Silesian Voivodeship	0.749	0.794	0.821	0.849	0.868	0.887	0.889	▲18.7%
Pomeranian Voivodeship	0.755	0.802	0.821	0.848	0.871	0.892	0.896	▲18.7%
Łódź Voivodeship	0.737	0.782	0.805	0.831	0.857	0.875	0.874	▲18.6%
Poland	0.745	0.791	0.813	0.840	0.863	0.881	0.881	▲18.4%
Podkarpackie Voivodeship	0.736	0.781	0.800	0.832	0.854	0.872	0.871	▲18.3%
Lesser Poland Voivodeship	0.753	0.799	0.818	0.848	0.873	0.892	0.891	▲18.3%
Lublin Voivodeship	0.730	0.773	0.795	0.821	0.849	0.866	0.863	▲18.2%
Świętokrzyskie Voivodeship	0.733	0.779	0.801	0.829	0.847	0.866	0.865	▲18.0%
Greater Poland Voivodeship	0.752	0.797	0.823	0.849	0.872	0.888	0.887	▲18.0%
Opole Voivodeship	0.741	0.787	0.809	0.833	0.855	0.870	0.872	▲17.7%
Kuyavian-Pomeranian Voivodeship	0.740	0.786	0.804	0.824	0.850	0.862	0.869	▲17.4%
Lubusz Voivodeship	0.740	0.786	0.808	0.830	0.850	0.862	0.869	▲17.4%
Warmian-Masurian Voivodeship	0.727	0.773	0.793	0.818	0.838	0.848	0.853	▲17.3%
West Pomeranian Voivodeship	0.745	0.791	0.808	0.832	0.854	0.869	0.873	▲17.2%

== See also ==
- List of countries by Human Development Index
