= Czyżów Szlachecki =

- Village
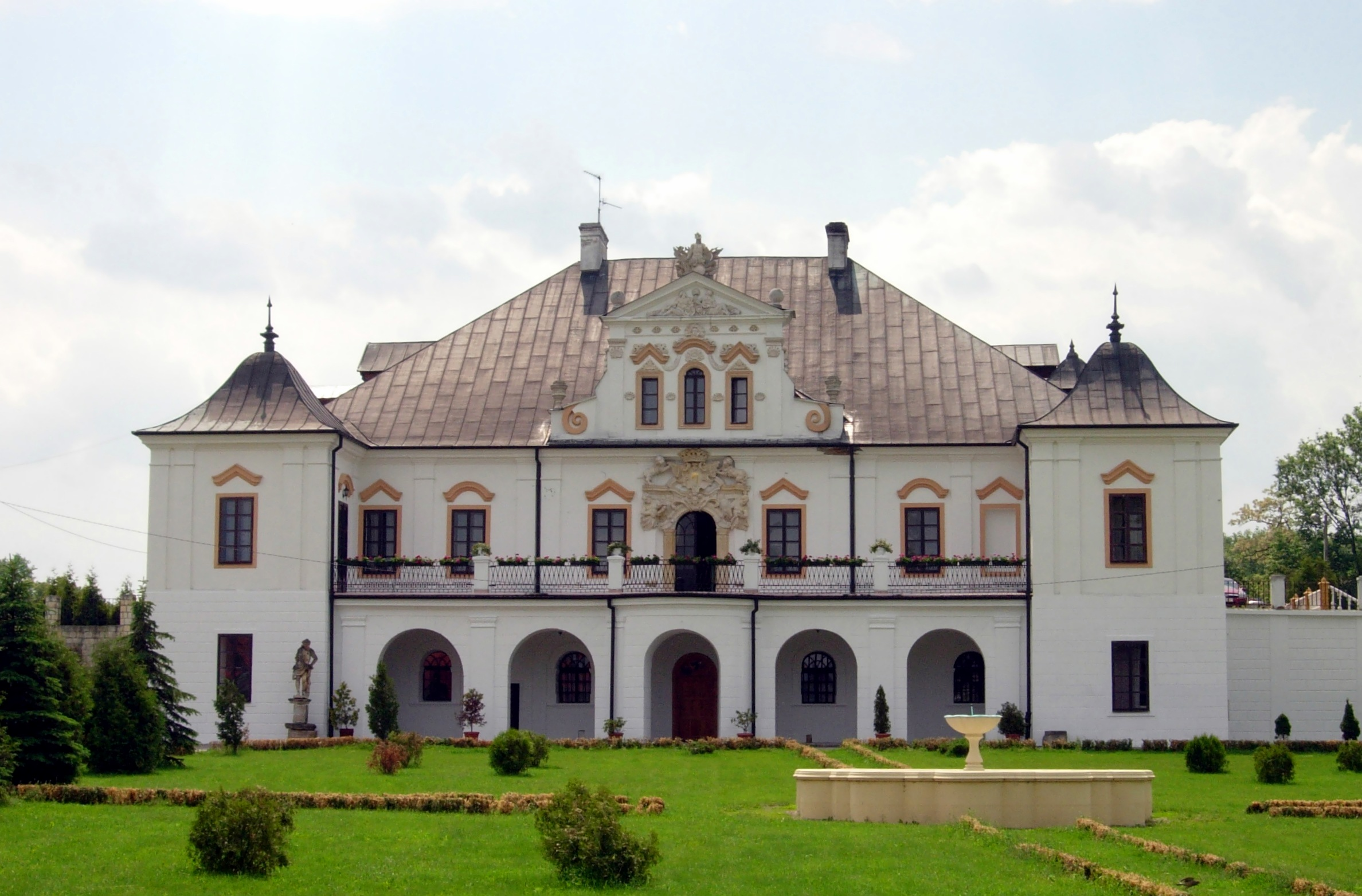
- Czyżowski Palace

- Location within Poland
- Coordinates: 50°49′43″N 21°46′37″E
- Country: Poland
- Voivodeship: Świętokrzyskie
- County: Sandomierz
- Gmina: Zawichost
- Time zone: UTC+1 (CET)
  - Summer (DST): UTC+2 (CEST)
- Vehicle registration: TSA

Czyżów Szlachecki (Polish pronunciation: [ˈtʂɨʐuf ʂlaˈxɛtskʲi]) is a village in the administrative district of Gmina Zawichost, within Sandomierz County, Świętokrzyskie Voivodeship, in south-central Poland. It lies approximately 7 km (4 mi) north-west of Zawichost, 17 km (11 mi) north of Sandomierz, and 82 km (51 mi) east of the regional capital Kielce. The Czyżów Szlachecki Castle is located in the village.

The landmark of the village is the Baroque Czyżowski Palace.
