= Kurozwęki Palace =

Coordinates: 50°35′20″N 21°06′17″E

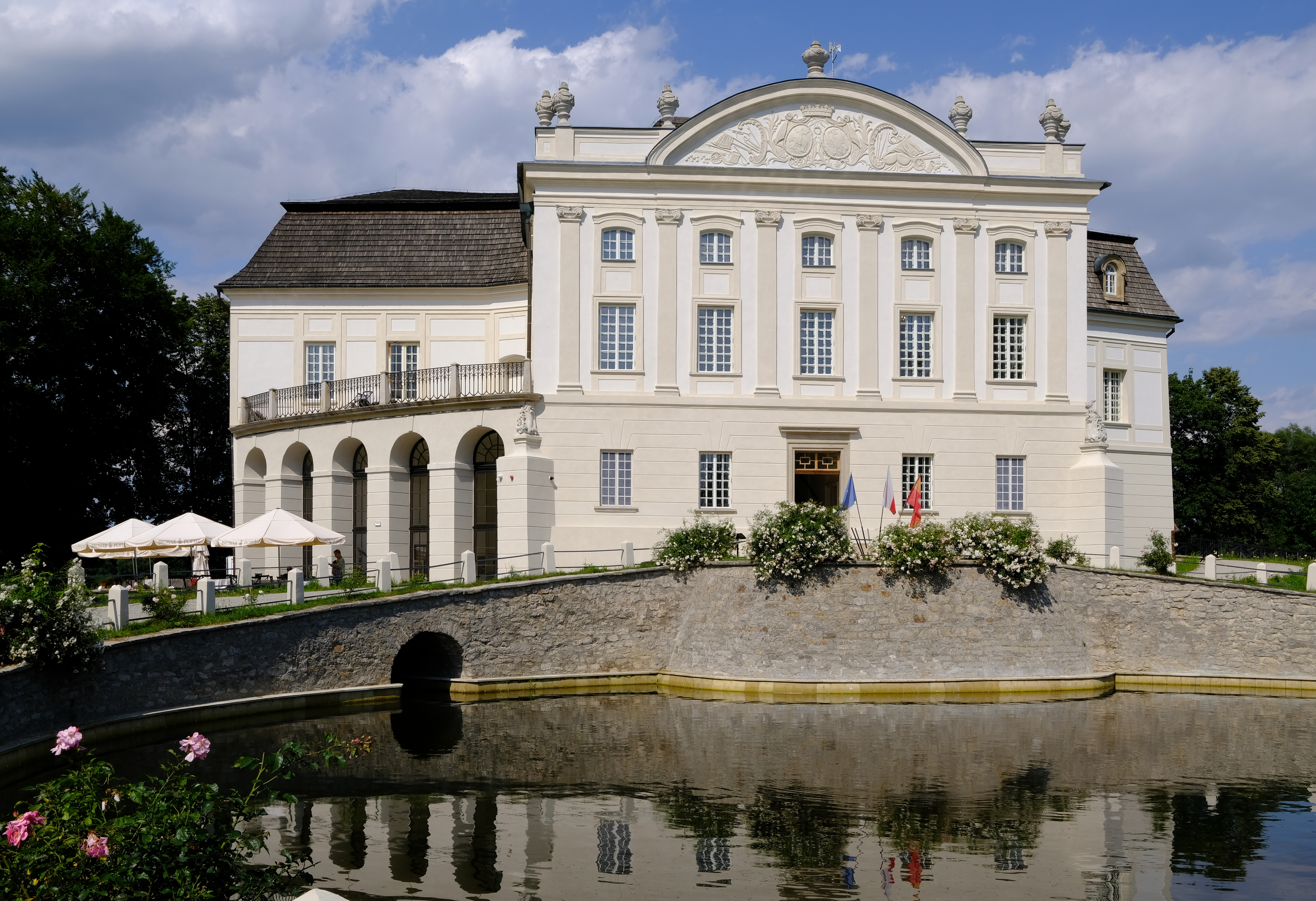
Kurozwęki Palace

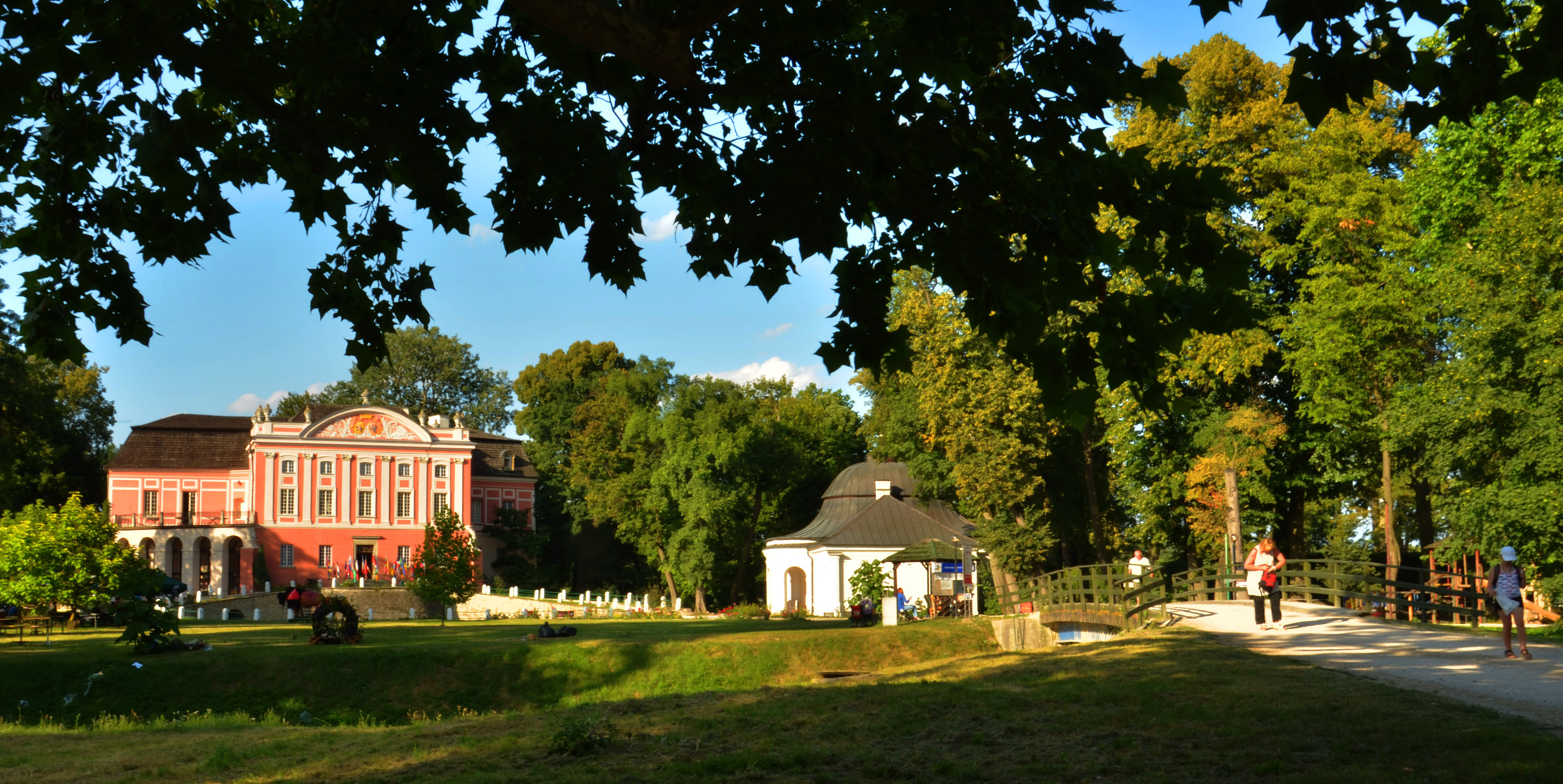
As seen from the palatial gardens

Kurozwęki Palace (Polish: Pałac Kurozwęki: Latin: Castrum Curoswank) is a Baroque-Classical residence in Kurozwęki, Poland.

In the second half of the 14th century, de Kurozwanky (later Kurozwęki) family erected a castle referred to in a document dating back to the 1400s as “castrum Curoswank”. Over the centuries the castle was rebuilt several times and given a representative character. By the end of the 18th century, the building evolved from a defensive castle into a baroque and classicistic residence.

The castle edifice, located in the complex of park, and palace are richly decorated with its five-axle facade and galleried courtyard.

== History ==
The village was first mentioned in 1246, in Prince's Bolesław Wstydliwy documents as "comes Mistigneuus filius Martini de Kurozwansch". In the first half of the 13th century, the town was an estate of Poraj's family, coming as int straight line from one of st. Wojciech's legendary brothers - Poraj, who due to his brother's merits, received the grounds around Kurozwęki and the knighthood from the Prince Bolesław Chrobry. Later, the Pojar family changed their last name to Kurozwęccy - from the name of their biggest manor.

A legend says that the "Kurozwęki" comes from a sound (Polish: dźwięki) made by a rooster (old Polish: kur), whose loud noises helped the Prince and his men to find a way to the town when they got lost during a hunting trip.

== Architecture ==
=== 14th - 15th century ===
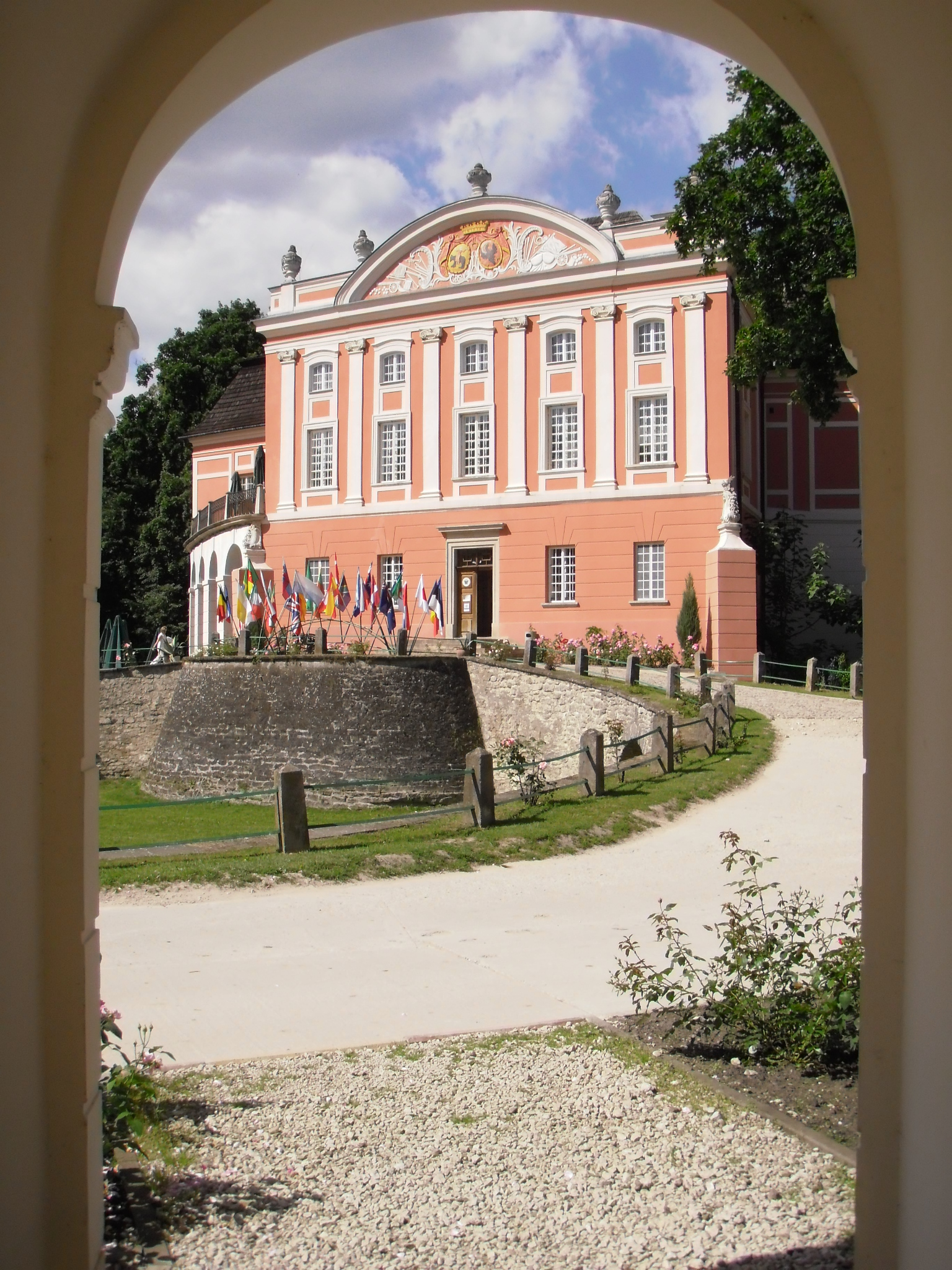
Frontal facade

In the second half of the 14th century, a gothic castle was built, later described as Castrum Curoswank. Some defensive buildings were erected in the centre of the town possibly by Dobiesław, who was a chatelaine of Cracow in 1381–1395. His family owned the fortalice for the next 100 years. Then a stone oval-shaped wall (28x40m) was built, surrounded by a moat to protect the wooden buildings within the walls. A short time later a 14m high, four-side, four-storey stone tower was built on the south side of the court. The attic was built from wood and served both defensive and residential function. The remaining part of the castle's courtyard was filled up with wooden buildings. Outside of the walls were farms which delivered food to the castle. Later the castle and town were transferred to the next owners, who attempted to change the look of the castle to then-current standards. After Dobiesław's death in 1397, the castle changed its owners seven times over 124 years.

In the 15th century-old, the wooden building was changed and replaced by a stone structure. The change took effect on a higher level of the courtyard. Extension works were carried out due to the urgent need to improve the existing fortifications. The construction of a building started on the eastern side and then two more buildings were built, one to the north and on the east–west axis.

=== 16th - 18th century ===
In 1521, after nearly one-and-a-half centuries of ownership by Kurozwęccy family, the castle became a property of Jan Lanckoroński, who received it as a dowry from his new wife. The castle was Lanckoroński's property until 1747. In this time the gothic form of buildings was changed to renaissance architecture, which means the castle was changed to a palace. The first large extension of the palace was begun at the beginning of the 16th century when the last wooden building was turned into a stone one, which was a part of interior buildings. A step towards tidying up the courtyard was also taken. For this, it was necessary to demolish a north-western corner of the wall and replaced it by a three-storied building so-called hen's foot – corner edifice which acted as residential and representative functions. The same time there was built a quadrilateral tower gate on the south outside of the wall. At the beginning of the 17th century in western building, the new chapel was rebuilt. The old one was placed in this building probably to the end of the 15th century, when Krzysztof Lanckoroński made priests to leave the town – he was a votary of Calvinism. An initiator of new chapel was Zbigniew Lanckoroński – the heir of Kurozwęki, and Lord in 1591–1619. The result of next changes in the 17th century was connecting buildings to two wings of the palace – west and east.

This process was finished very late, at the turn of the 18th century when on the south, west and north side of court two-storey cloisters were built. Also, the level of court was banked up and all interiors were equalized and on the east side of south cloisters, double staircase were added. Rising of terrain made the ground floor as a basement and the highest late-middle time story became baroque piano mobile – representative and residential rooms connected by enfilade. Probably on the same time the way through east wing, called Black Gate was built.

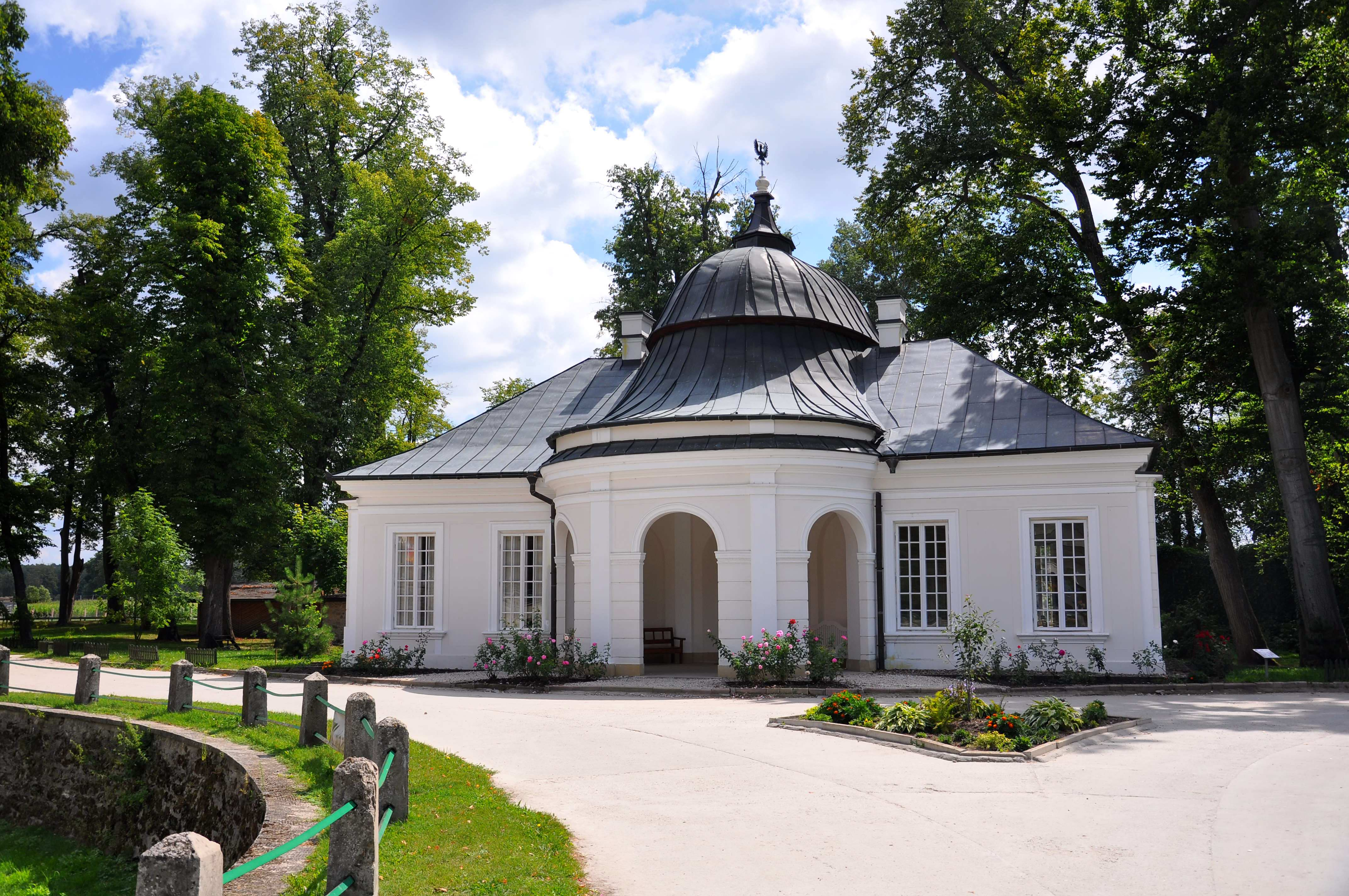
Eastern pavilion

The last one from Lanckoroński family was Stanisław – he died without any descendants. Stanisław widow – Anna Dembiński from family of Rawicz married Maciej Sołtyk in 1752. He was the general of the Polish army and voivode (local ruler) of Sandomierz. Sołtyk was an initiator of the next modernizations – changing the palace to neat, baroque – classical residence with galleries following the example of Wawel. Work carrying out in 1768-1772 had been aimed at developing tower gate - it become five-axis palace wing, including representative ballroom on the first floor. The wing is in a semicircle topped by rococo ornament and two Rawicz's and Sołtyk's family crest. Interior style was changed to rococo in west and east wings including dining room, Red and Green living room, library. After demolishing of south gate rebuilt of the Back Gate was necessary and at the consequence east wing as well. Chapel in this wing was converted and decorated with Transfiguration of Jesus polychromy and the owner's patrons - St. Anna and St. Matthias. Redeveloped shape of the palace was normalized by a mansard roof. Probably in the '70s on the main axis of park avenue two pavilions were built - teahouse and orangery. The last change in the architectural look of the palace were carried out in the first half of 19th century - the gallery was rebuilt into hallways and glazed in, the gothic vault was installed in basements and on the west corner of the palace, gorgeous observation deck to main avenue and park were opened.

=== 19th - 20th century ===
Maciej Sołtyk had three wives. The last of them - Kunegunda from family of Koszowski, has vested the ownership of property in her brother-in-law - Tomasz Sołtyk. Then in 1811, the property inherited his only son - Antoni Tomasz. He partly renovated the mansion, which was considerably devastated at the turn of the century. With the help of gardener - Jan Zalauf from the Kingdom of Bohemia, he created a beautiful landscaped gardens with aviary and orangery, just next to the castle. After Antoni's death in 1831 the estate became a property of his daughter Emilia. Two years later she married Lord Paweł Popiel and was dowered with a house, where they later lived. Prior to moving in a complete renovation of interiors was carried out. The great-grandson of Paweł - Stanisław Popiel was the last owner of the palace before the World War II.

=== After World War II ===
When the Popiel family emigrated to West in 1944, the palace was taken over by the government which organized there a temporary accommodation and the offices of local state-owned farm and in 1956 the post of Social Insurance Institution was located here. There was a plan to change the palace to psychiatric hospital - renovation has been started but never finished, from that moment the palace was abandoned and started to deteriorate. In 1991 after one of the columns collapsed, the grounds and the palace were bought by a priest, Marcin Popiel, brother of Stanisław, who then passed the estate down to his nephew Jan Marcin Popiel - the current owner of the palace.

== See also ==
- List of Baroque residences in Polish-Lithuanian Commonwealth
- Baroque in Poland
- Classical architecture
- List of classical architecture terms
