= Świętokrzyskie Voivodeship =

Voivodeship of Poland

Świętokrzyskie Voivodeship Województwo świętokrzyskie
- Voivodeship
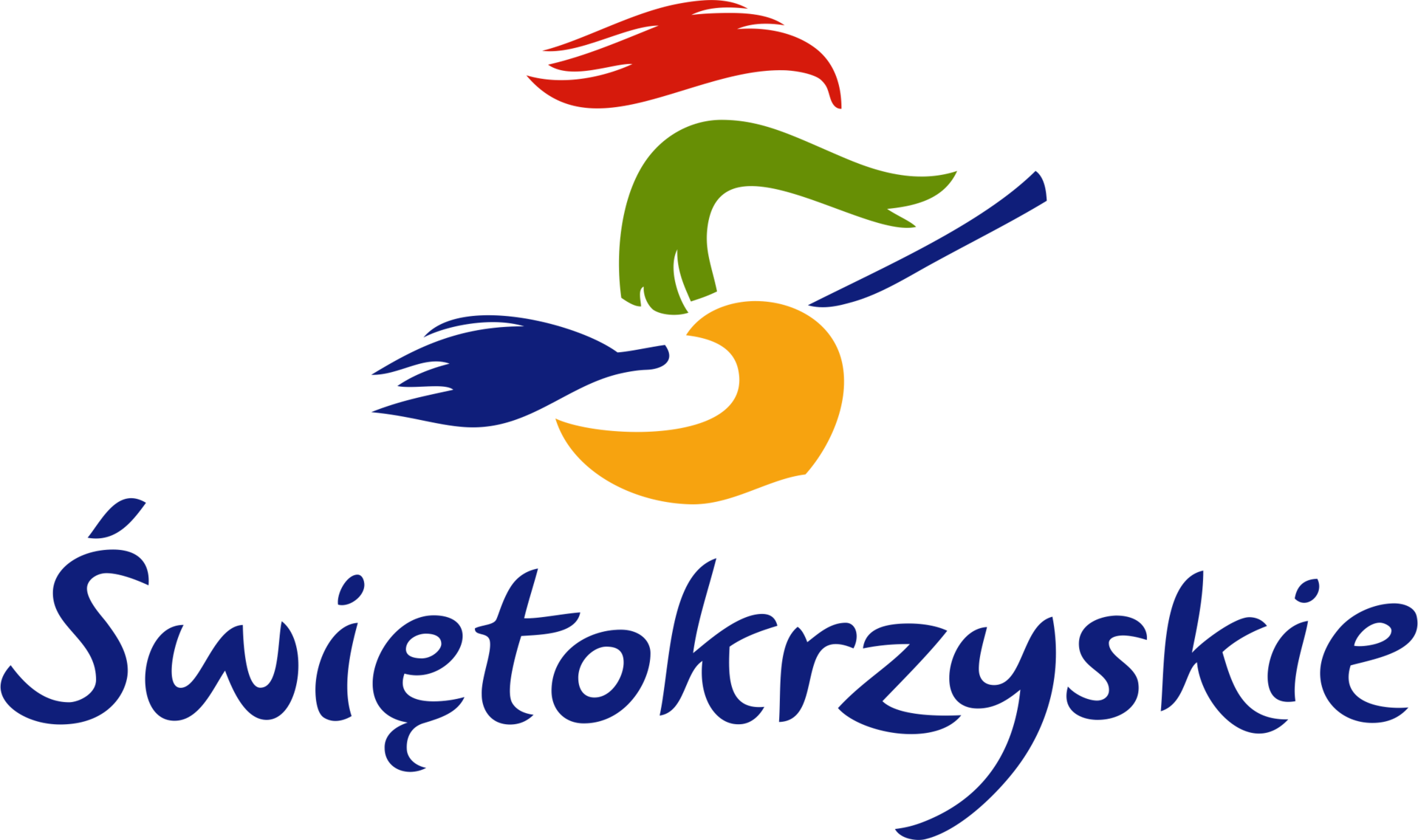
- Flag Coat of arms Brandmark

- Location within Poland

- Division into counties
- Coordinates (Kielce): 50°53′N 20°37′E
- Country: Poland
- Capital: Kielce
- Counties: 1 city, 13 land counties *: Kielce; Busko County; Jędrzejów County; Kazimierza County; Kielce County; Końskie County; Opatów County; Ostrowiec County; Pińczów County; Sandomierz County; Skarżysko County; Starachowice County; Staszów County; Włoszczowa County

Government
  - Body: Świętokrzyskie Voivodeship executive board
  - Voivode: Józef Bryk (PO)
  - Marshal: Renata Janik (PiS)
  - EP: Lesser Poland and Świętokrzyskie

Area
  - Total: 11,672 km^{2} (4,507 sq mi)

Population (2019)
  - Total: 1,237,369
  - Density: 106.01/km^{2} (274.57/sq mi)
  - Urban: 562,221
  - Rural: 675,148

GDP
  - Total: €19.642 billion (2024)
  - Per capita: €17,664 (2024)
- ISO 3166 code: PL-26
- Vehicle registration: T
- HDI (2019): 0.866 very high · 12th
- Website: www.kielce.uw.gov.pl
- further divided into 102 gminas

Świętokrzyskie Voivodeship (Polish: województwo świętokrzyskie [vɔjɛˈvut͡stfɔ ɕfjɛntɔˈkʂɨskʲɛ]), also known as Holy Cross Voivodeship, is a voivodeship (province) in southeastern Poland, in the historical region of Lesser Poland. The province's capital and largest city is Kielce. The voivodeship takes its name from the Świętokrzyskie (Holy Cross) Mountains.

Świętokrzyskie Voivodeship is bounded by six other voivodeships: Masovian to the north, Lublin to the east, Subcarpathian to the south-central, Lesser Poland to the south, Silesian to the southwest, and Łódź to the northwest.

The province covers an area of 11,672 square kilometres (4,507 sq mi), making it the second smallest province (after Opole). As at 2019, the total population of Świętokrzyskie Province was 1,237,369.

== History ==
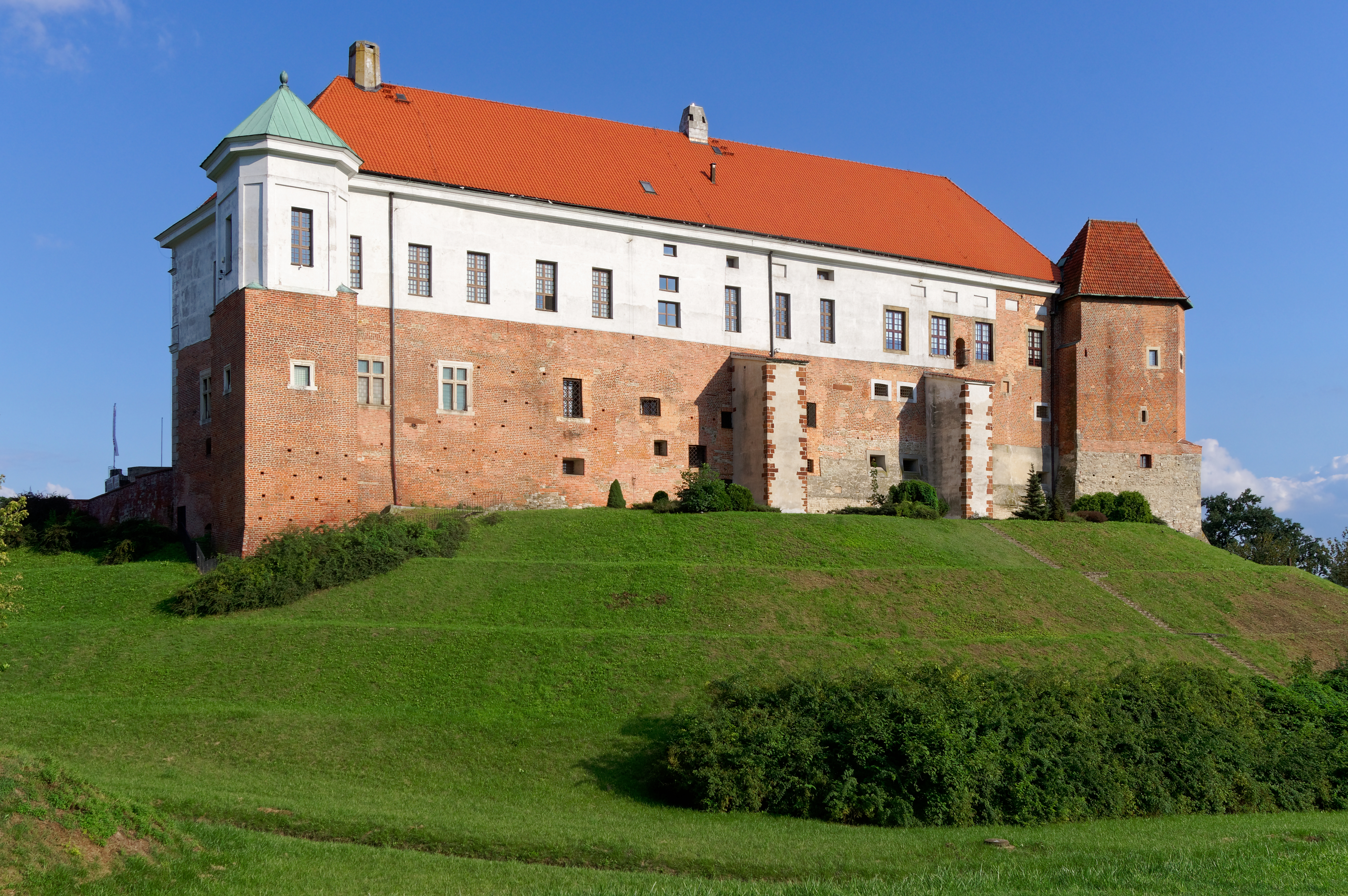
Sandomierz Royal Castle, a Historic Monument of Poland

Inhabited since pre-historic times, the area of Skarżysko-Kamienna and Wąchock contains several hundred former Paleolithic sites from 13,000-10,000 years ago, now known as the Rydno Archaeological Reserve. From 3900 BC to 1600 BC, striped flint was mined at Krzemionki, one of the largest known complexes of prehistoric flint mines in Europe, now a UNESCO World Heritage Site and Historic Monument of Poland.

The territory formed part of Poland since its establishment in the 10th century. Sandomierz was mentioned as one of three centers of the Kingdom of Poland, along Kraków and Wrocław, in the early-12th-century Gesta principum Polonorum chronicle. Sandomierz and Wiślica, whose historic landmarks are designated Historic Monuments of Poland, are former medieval ducal seats of the Piast dynasty. In the early modern period the Old-Polish Industrial Region developed in the region. Following the late-18th-century Partitions of Poland, the region witnessed several uprisings against foreign rule, i.e. the November Uprising of 1830–1831 and January Uprising of 1863–1864. In the interbellum, the region was part of reborn independent Poland. Its industry was developed as part of the Central Industrial Region of Poland.

During World War II, it was occupied by Germany, with the occupiers committing their genocidal policies against Poles and Jews in the region, massacring civilians, including at Skarżysko-Kamienna and Michniów, and operating numerous prisons and forced labour camps. The Polish resistance movement was active in the region, with the short-lived Republic of Pińczów liberated in 1944.

Holy Cross Province was created on 1 January 1999 out of the former Kielce Voivodeship, eastern Częstochowa Voivodeship, and western Tarnobrzeg Voivodeship, pursuant to the Polish local government reforms adopted in 1998.

== Cities and towns ==
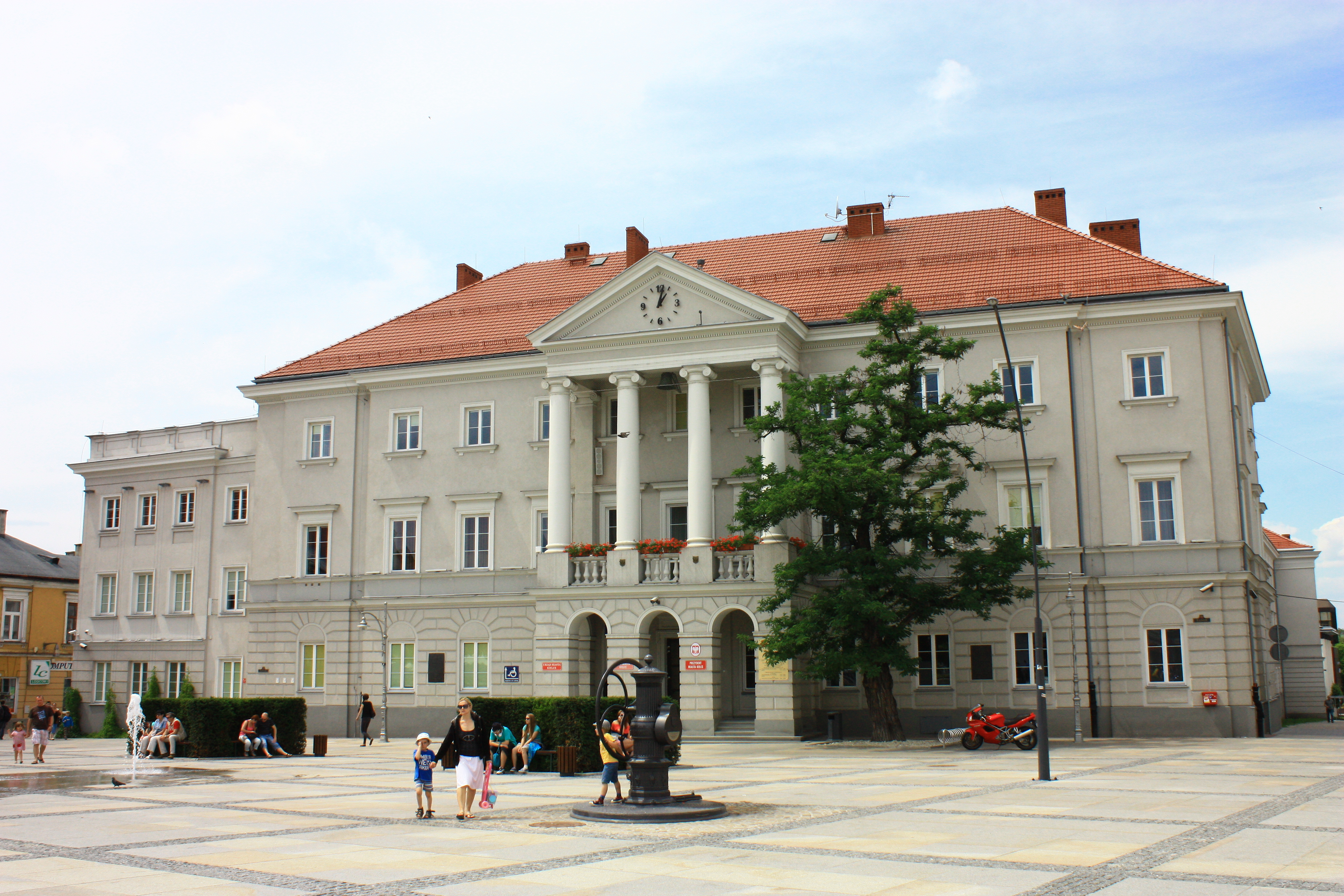
Kielce is the capital of the voivodeship

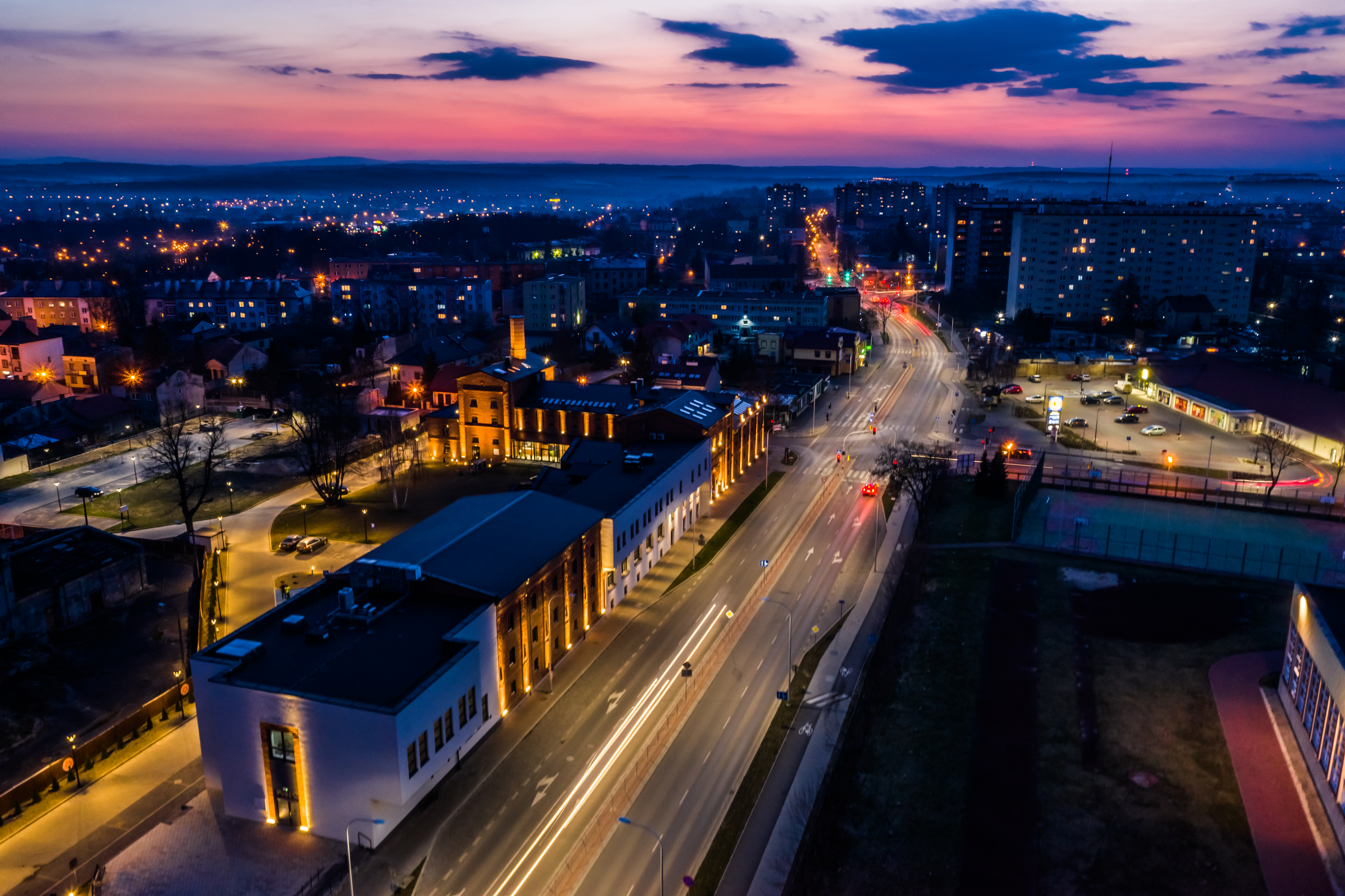
Ostrowiec Świętokrzyski is the second most populous city

Historical population
Year	Pop.	±%
1988	1,317,441	—
2002	1,297,477	−1.5%
2011	1,280,721	−1.3%
2021	1,196,557	−6.6%

The voivodeship contains 4 cities and 39 towns. These are listed below in descending order of population (according to official figures for 2019):

Cities (governed by a city mayor or prezydent miasta):
1. Kielce (195,266)
2. Ostrowiec Świętokrzyski (68,641)
3. Starachowice (48,646)
4. Skarżysko-Kamienna (45,068)

Towns:

1. Sandomierz (23,494)
2. Końskie (19,176)
3. Busko-Zdrój (15,832)
4. Jędrzejów (15,076)
5. Staszów (14,762)
6. Pińczów (10,774)
7. Włoszczowa (9,985)
8. Suchedniów (8,347)
9. Połaniec (8,098)
10. Opatów (6,466)
11. Sędziszów (6,451)
12. Stąporków (5,639)
13. Kazimierza Wielka (5,550)
14. Ożarów (4,569)
15. Chęciny (4,444)
16. Małogoszcz (3,748)
17. Chmielnik (3,681)
18. Radoszyce (3,135)
19. Ćmielów (3,012)
20. Kunów (2,967)
21. Daleszyce (2,896)
22. Wąchock (2,766)
23. Koprzywnica (2,470)
24. Bodzentyn (2,233)
25. Osiek (2,007)
26. Oleśnica (1,849)
27. Zawichost (1,771)
28. Morawica (1,711)
29. Łagów (1,580)
30. Stopnica (1,420)
31. Nowa Słupia (1,360)
32. Skalbmierz (1,285)
33. Pierzchnica (1,144)
34. Pacanów (1,108)
35. Szydłów (1,097)
36. Nowy Korczyn (942)
37. Działoszyce (907)
38. Wiślica (516)
39. Opatowiec (332)
40. Piekoszów
41. Łopuszno
42. Wodzisław
43. Klimontów
44. Gowarczów
45. Iwaniska
46. Bogoria
47. Sobków

== Administrative divisions ==
Świętokrzyskie Voivodeship is divided into 14 counties (powiats): 1 city county and 13 land counties. These are further divided into 102 gminas.

The counties are listed in the following table (ordering within categories is by decreasing population).

English and Polish names	Area (km^{2})	Population (2019)	Seat	Other towns	Total gminas
City counties
Kielce	110	195,266			1
Land counties
Kielce County powiat kielecki	2,247	210,940	Kielce *	Chęciny, Chmielnik, Daleszyce, Bodzentyn, Łagów, Łopuszno, Morawica, Nowa Słupia, Piekoszów, Pierzchnica	19
Ostrowiec County powiat ostrowiecki	616	109,512	Ostrowiec Świętokrzyski	Ćmielów, Kunów	6
Starachowice County powiat starachowicki	523	89,925	Starachowice	Wąchock	5
Jędrzejów County powiat jędrzejowski	1,257	85,757	Jędrzejów	Sędziszów, Małogoszcz, Sobków, Wodzisław	9
Końskie County powiat konecki	1,140	80,154	Końskie	Stąporków, Radoszyce, Gowarczów	8
Sandomierz County powiat sandomierski	676	77,352	Sandomierz	Koprzywnica, Zawichost, Klimontów	9
Skarżysko County powiat skarżyski	395	74,343	Skarżysko-Kamienna	Suchedniów	5
Staszów County powiat staszowski	925	72,000	Staszów	Bogoria, Oleśnica, Osiek, Połaniec, Szydłów	8
Busko County powiat buski	967	71,807	Busko-Zdrój	Pacanów, Nowy Korczyn, Stopnica, Wiślica	8
Opatów County powiat opatowski	912	52,336	Opatów	Iwaniska, Ożarów	8
Włoszczowa County powiat włoszczowski	906	45,137	Włoszczowa		6
Pińczów County powiat pińczowski	611	39,100	Pińczów	Działoszyce	5
Kazimierza County powiat kazimierski	422	35,770	Kazimierza Wielka	Opatowiec, Skalbmierz	5
* seat not part of the county

== Economy ==
The gross domestic product (GDP) of the province was 11.6 billion € in 2018, accounting for 2.3% of the Polish economic output. GDP per capita adjusted for purchasing power was 15,400 € or 51% of the EU27 average in the same year. The GDP per employee was 58% of the EU average. Świętokrzyskie Voivodship is the province with the fifth lowest GDP per capita in Poland.

== Protected areas ==
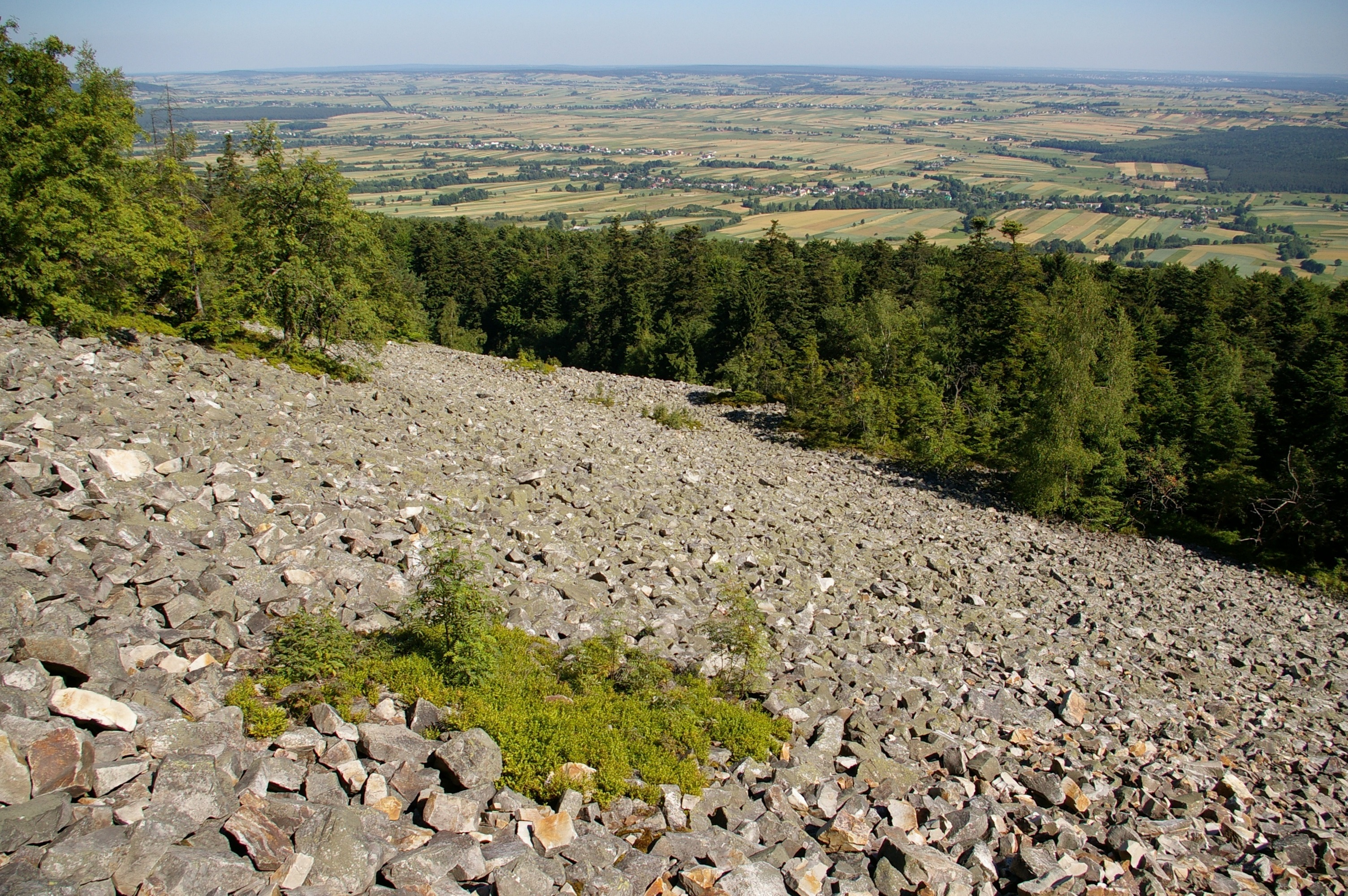
Świętokrzyski National Park

Protected areas in Świętokrzyskie Voivodeship include one National Park and nine Landscape Parks. These are listed below.

- Świętokrzyski National Park
- Chęciny-Kielce Landscape Park
- Cisów-Orłowiny Landscape Park
- Jeleniowska Landscape Park
- Kozubów Landscape Park
- Nida Landscape Park
- Przedbórz Landscape Park (partly in Łódź Voivodeship)
- Sieradowice Landscape Park
- Suchedniów-Oblęgorek Landscape Park
- Szaniec Landscape Park

== Sights and tourism ==
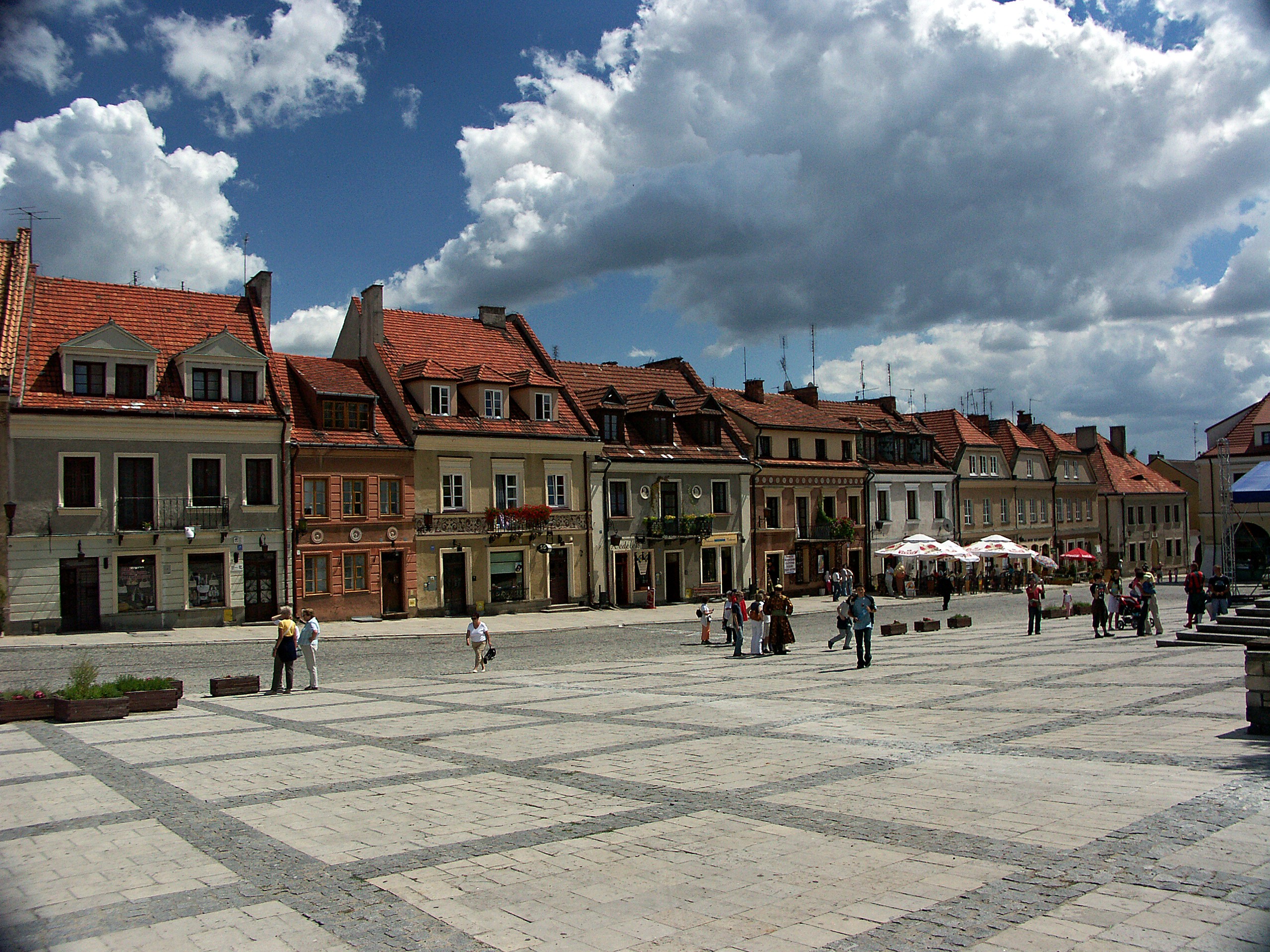
Sandomierz is one of the main tourist destinations in the Świętokrzyskie Voivodeship

There are ten Historic Monuments of Poland and one World Heritage Site in the voivodeship:

- Krzemionki Prehistoric Striped Flint Mining Region (listed as both)
- Kraków Bishops Palace and Kielce Cathedral
- Henryk Sienkiewicz Palace with park in Oblęgorek
- St. Martin's Collegiate Church, Opatów
- Camaldolese monastery complex in Rytwiany
- Old Town of Sandomierz
- Benedictine monastery complex at Święty Krzyż
- Krzyżtopór Castle in Ujazd
- Wąchock Abbey
- Collegiate Basilica of the Birth of the Blessed Virgin Mary and stronghold in Wiślica

Preserved old towns include Opatów and the fortified town of Szydłów. In Opatów and Sandomierz there are underground tourist routes in historic cellars under the old town market squares. There are multiple castles, including in Bodzentyn, Chęciny, Sandomierz and Szydłów, and palaces, including in Czyżów Szlachecki and Kurozwęki.

There are two spa towns: Busko-Zdrój and Solec-Zdrój.

Ćmielów, a town with a rich tradition of porcelain production, is home to the Living Porcelain Museum.

There are numerous World War II memorials, including memorials at the site of Nazi massacres of Poles and Holocaust memorials.

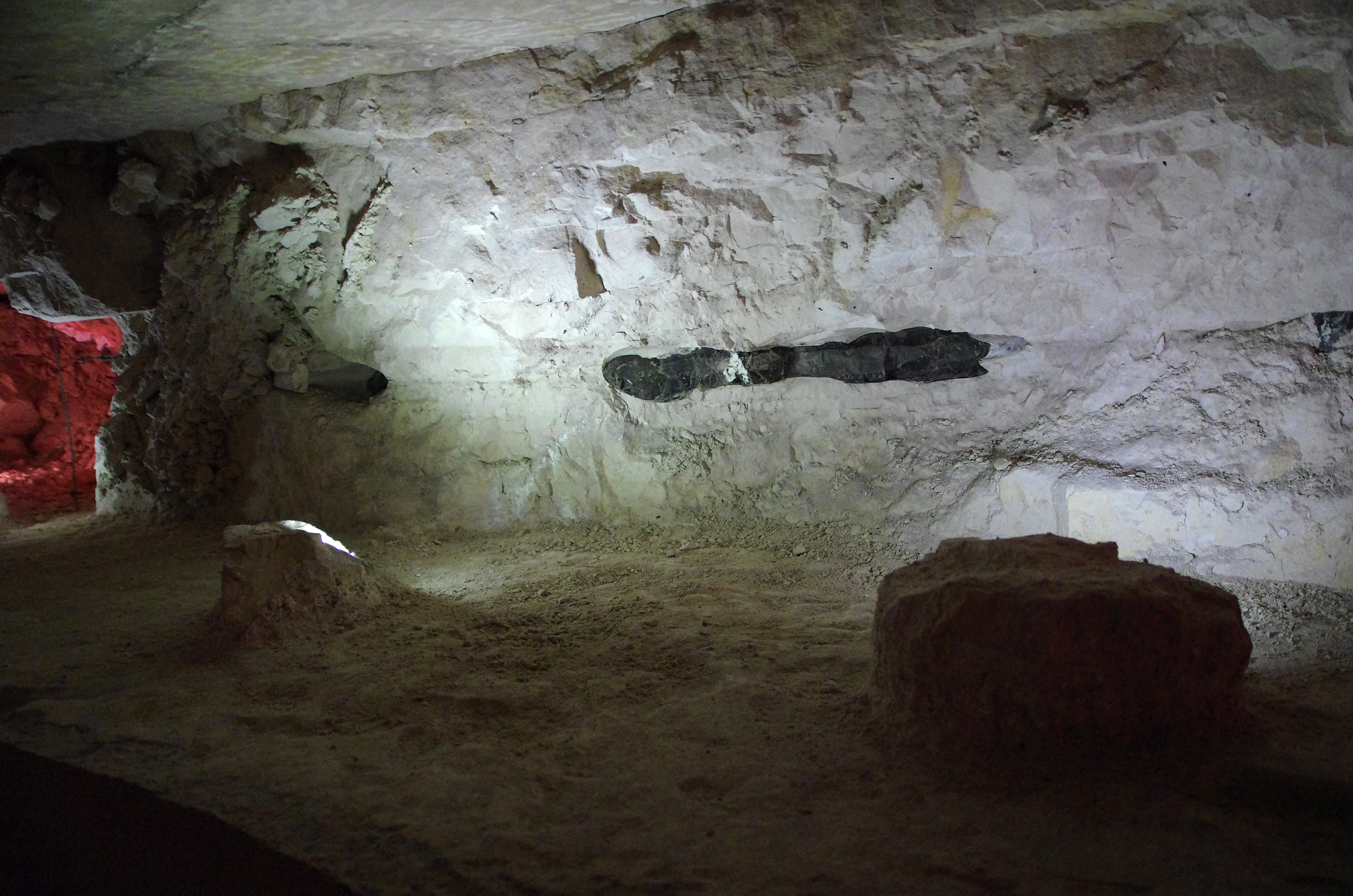
Krzemionki

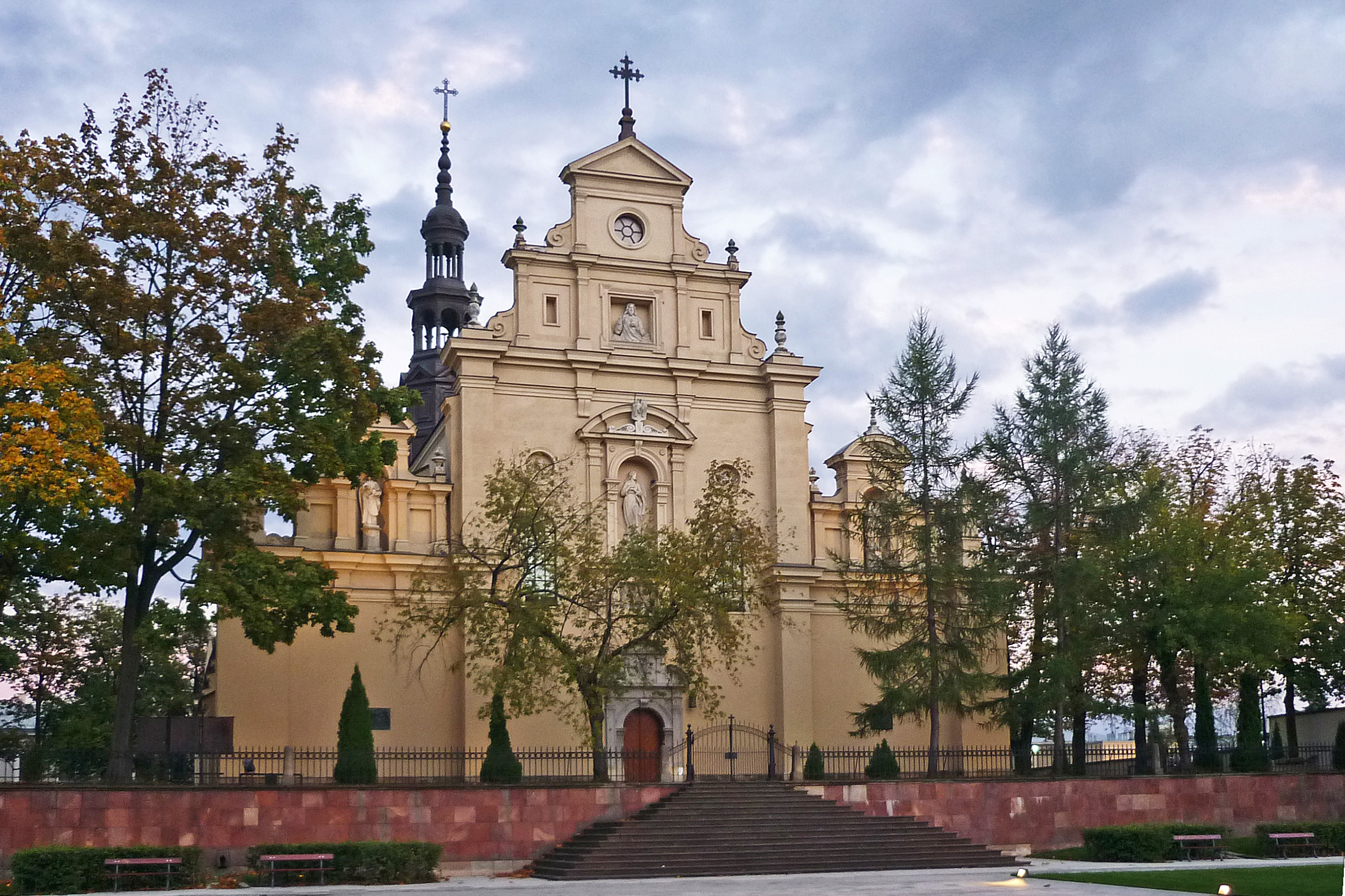
Kielce Cathedral

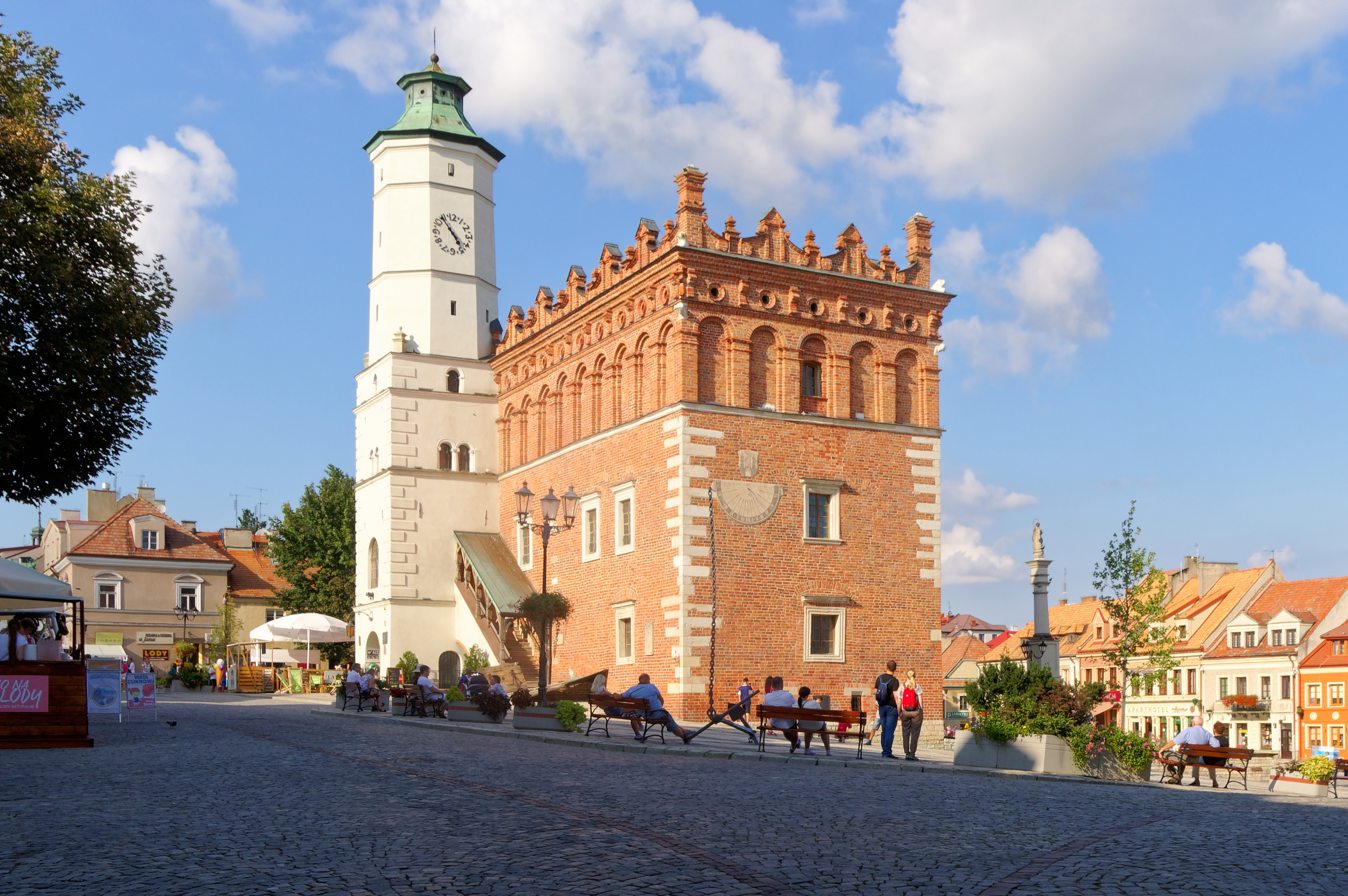
Town Hall in Sandomierz

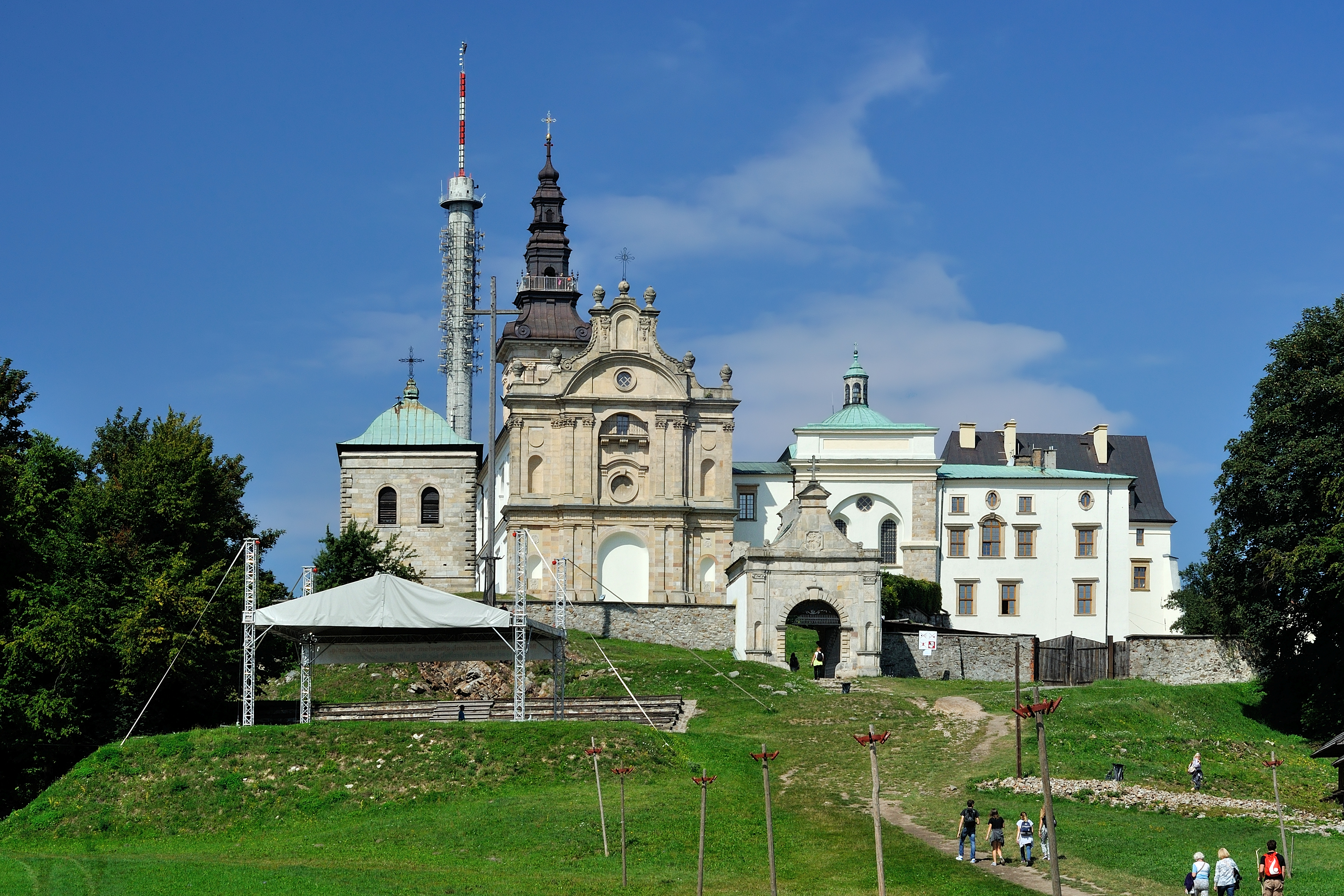
Święty Krzyż Monastery

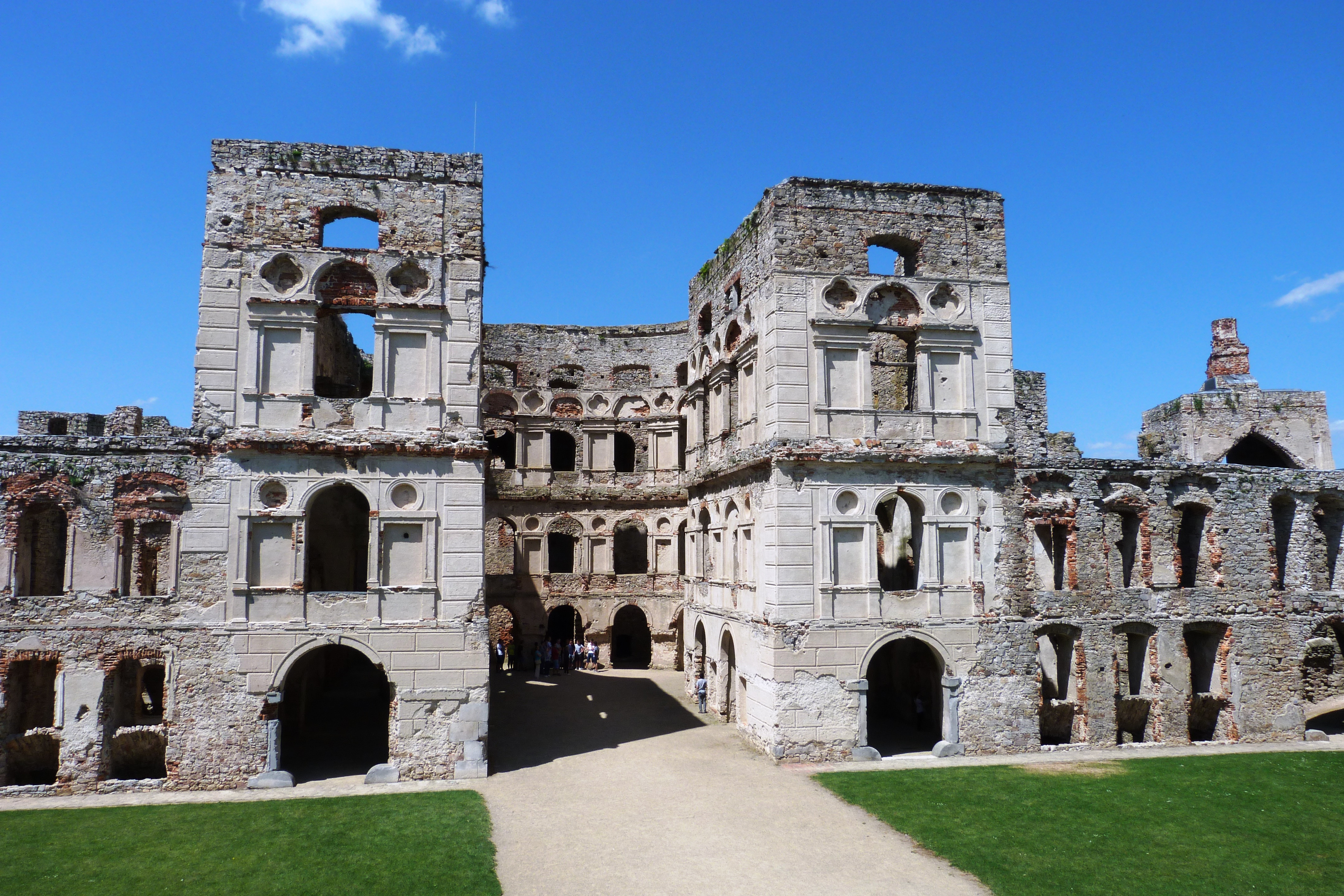
Krzyżtopór

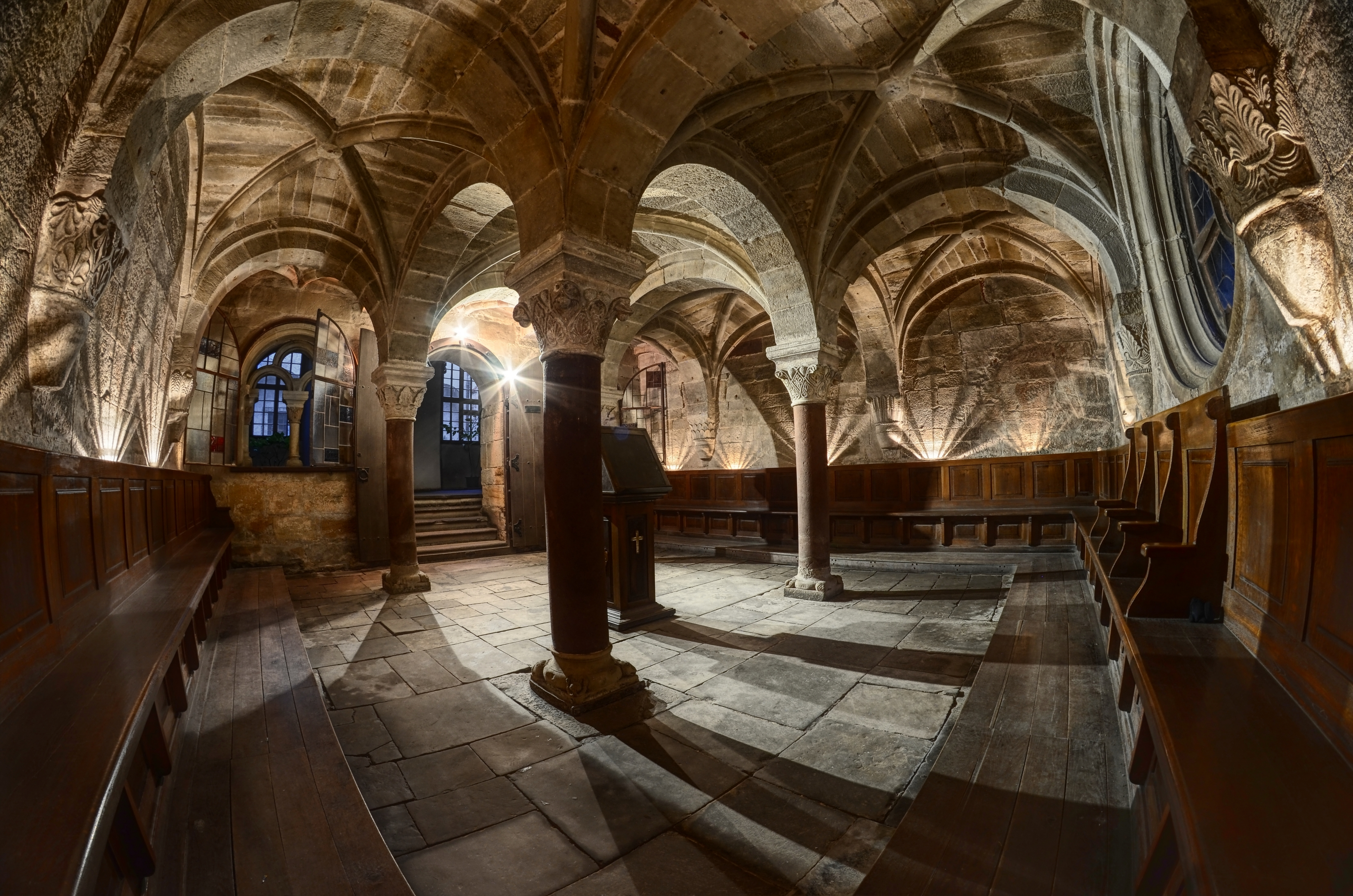
Wąchock Abbey

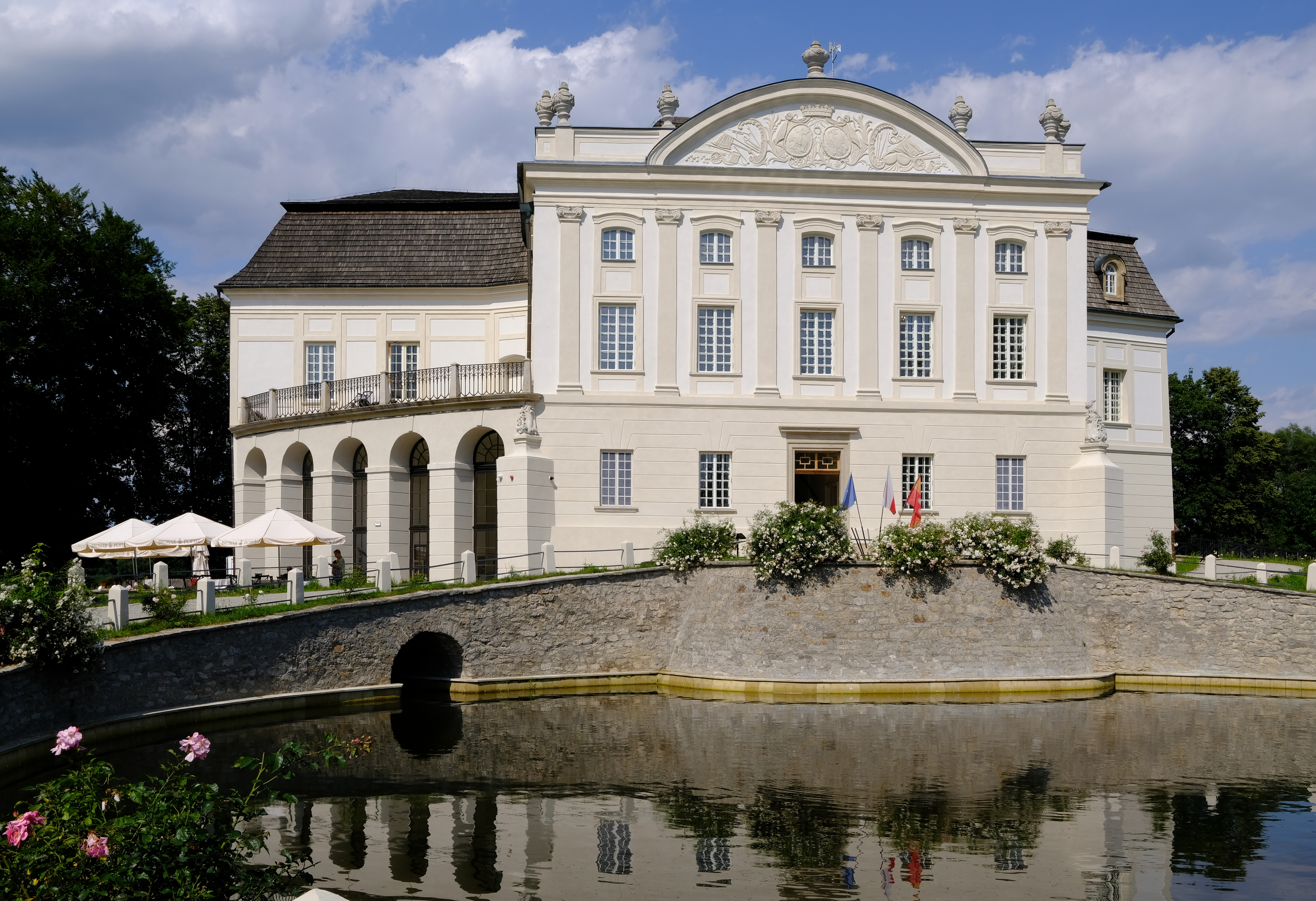
Kurozwęki Palace

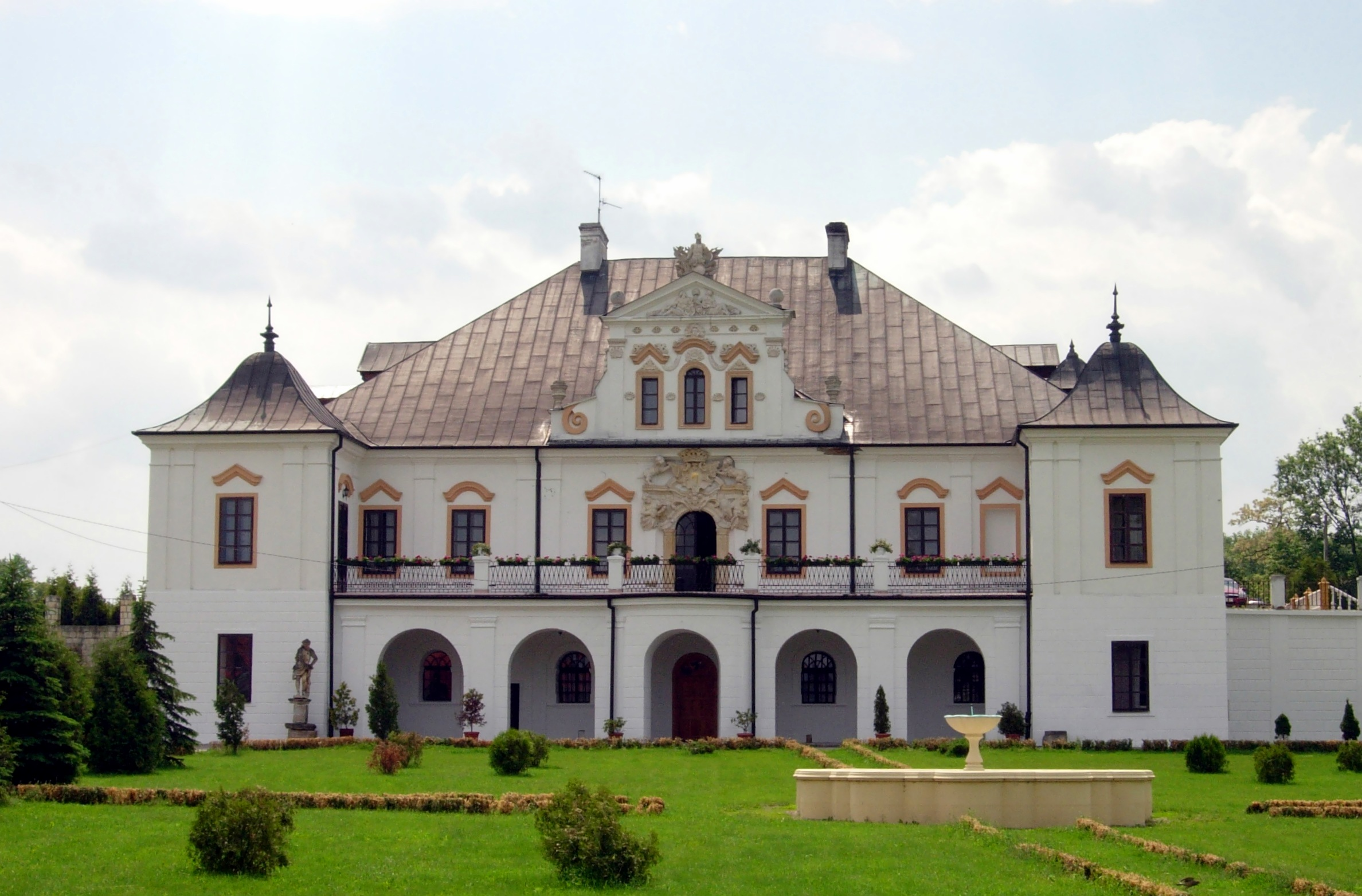
Czyżów Szlachecki Palace

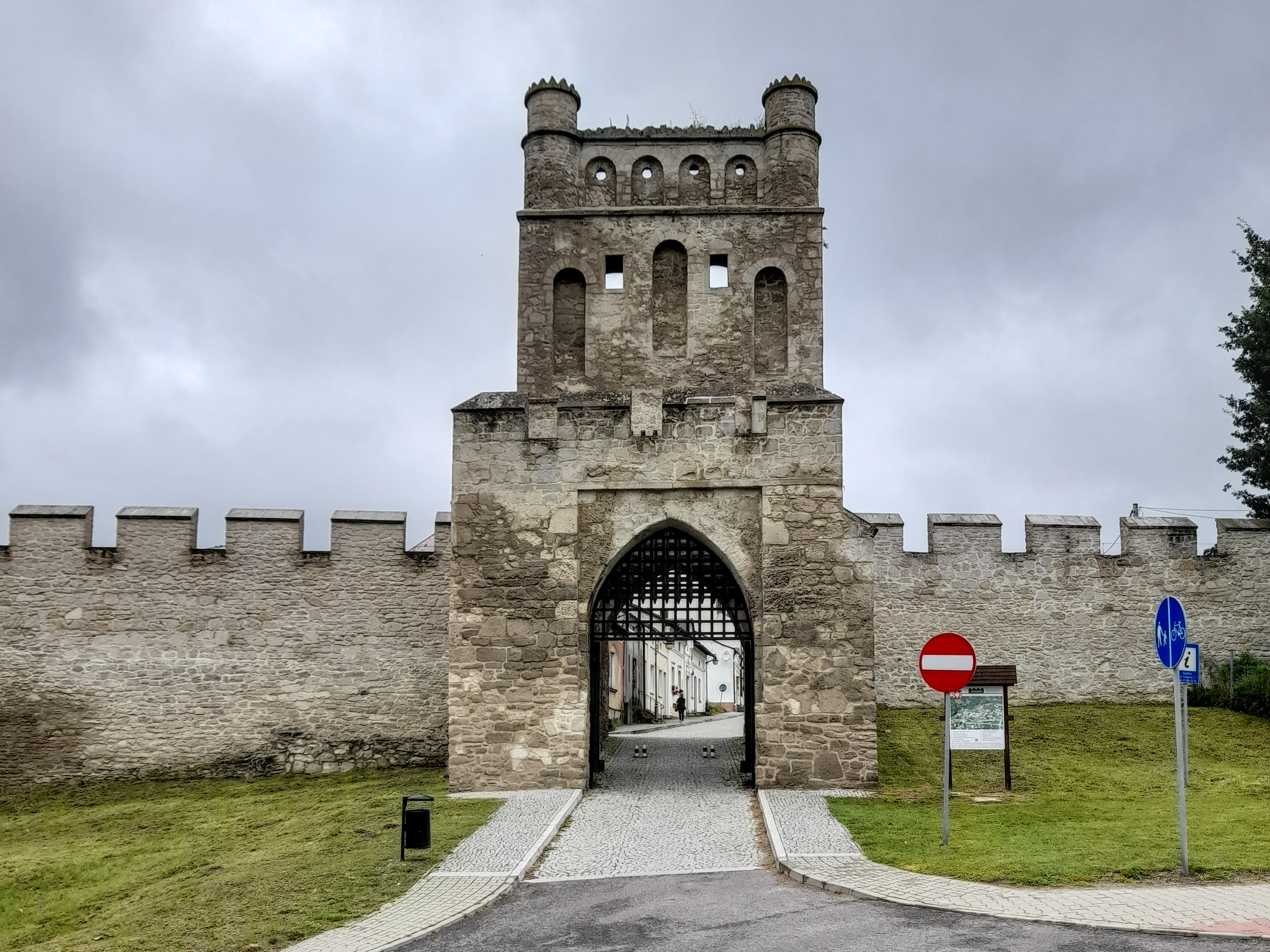
Fortified town of Szydłów

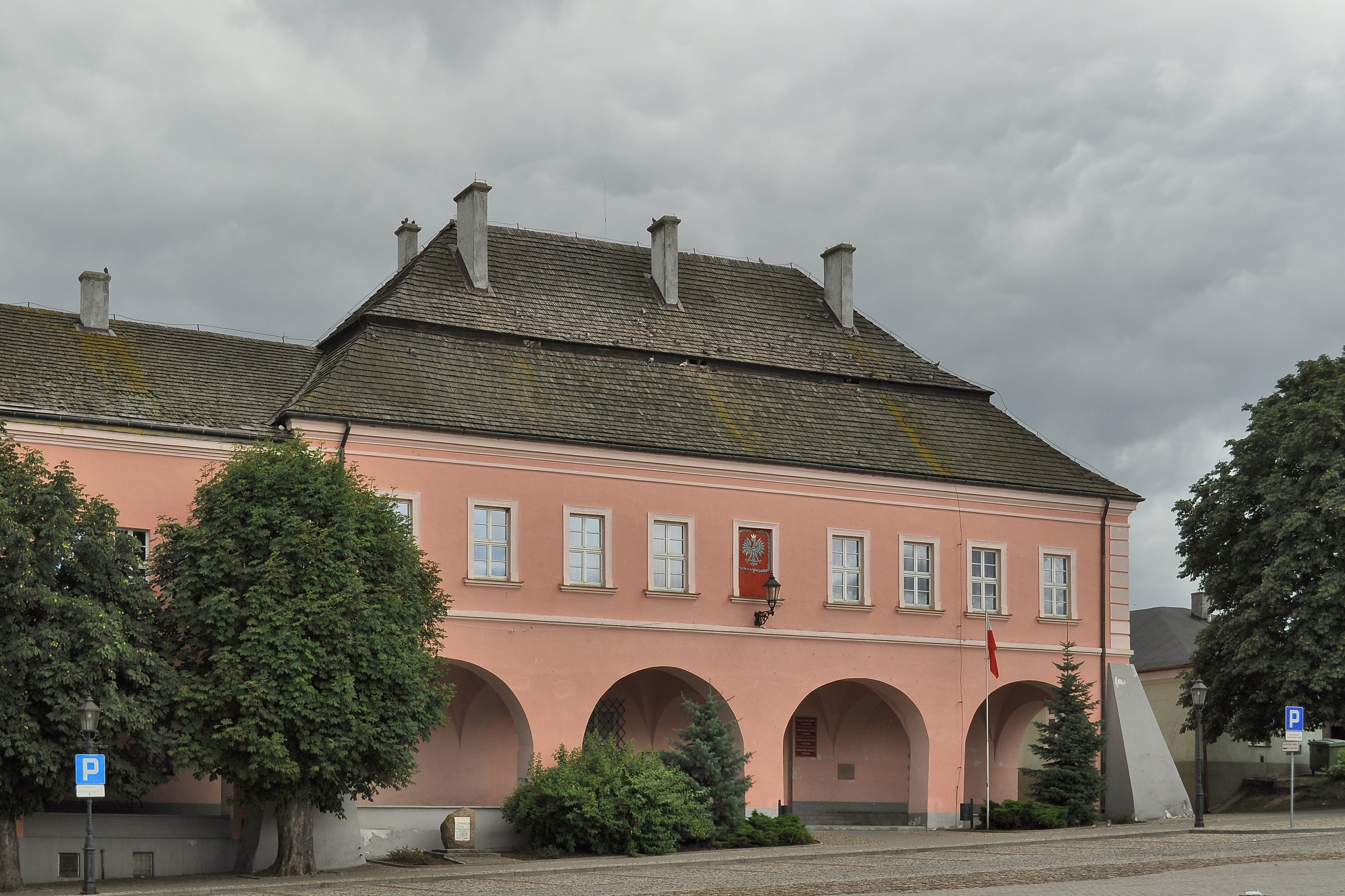
Town hall in Opatów

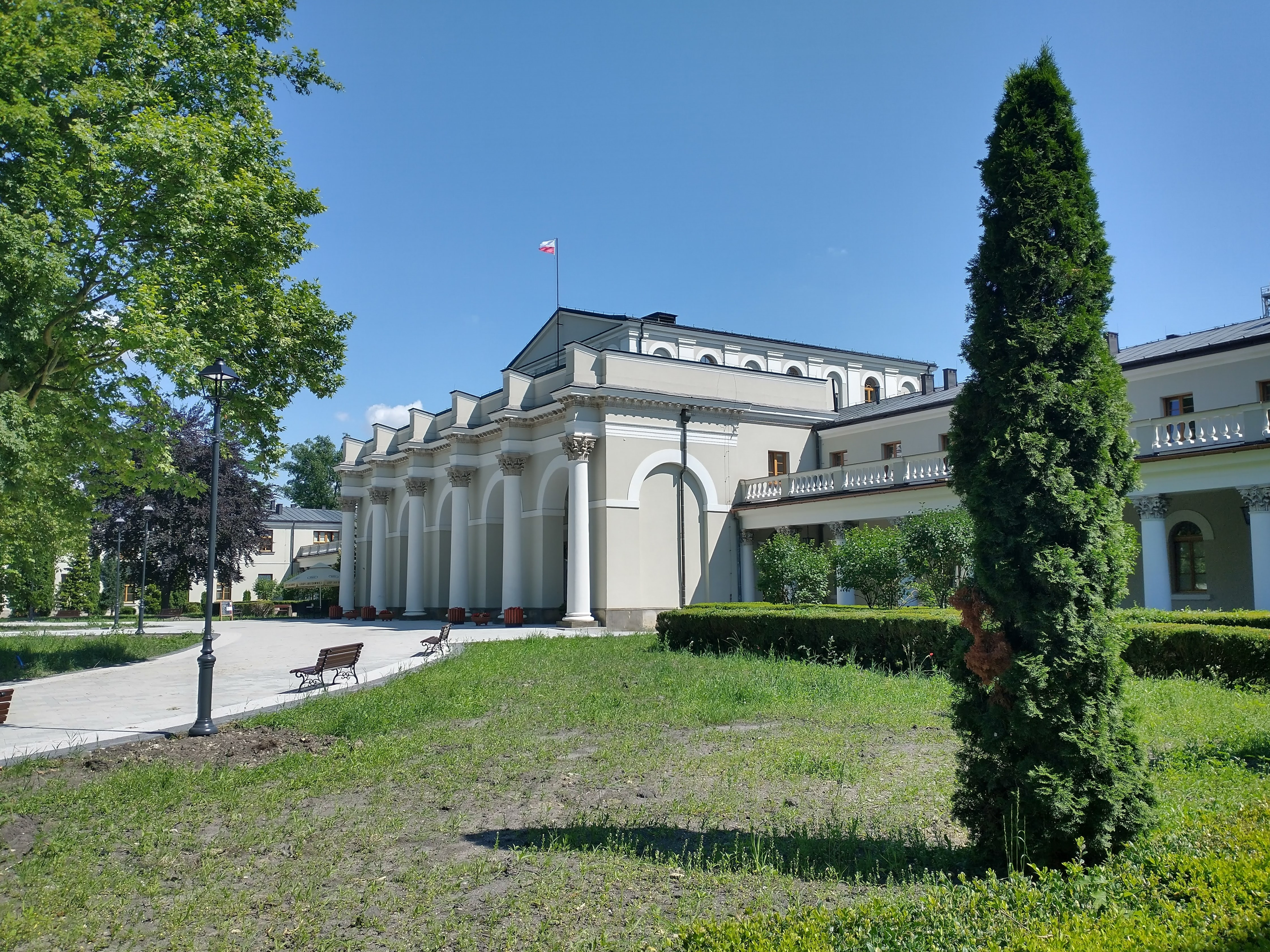
Sanatorium Marconi in Busko-Zdrój

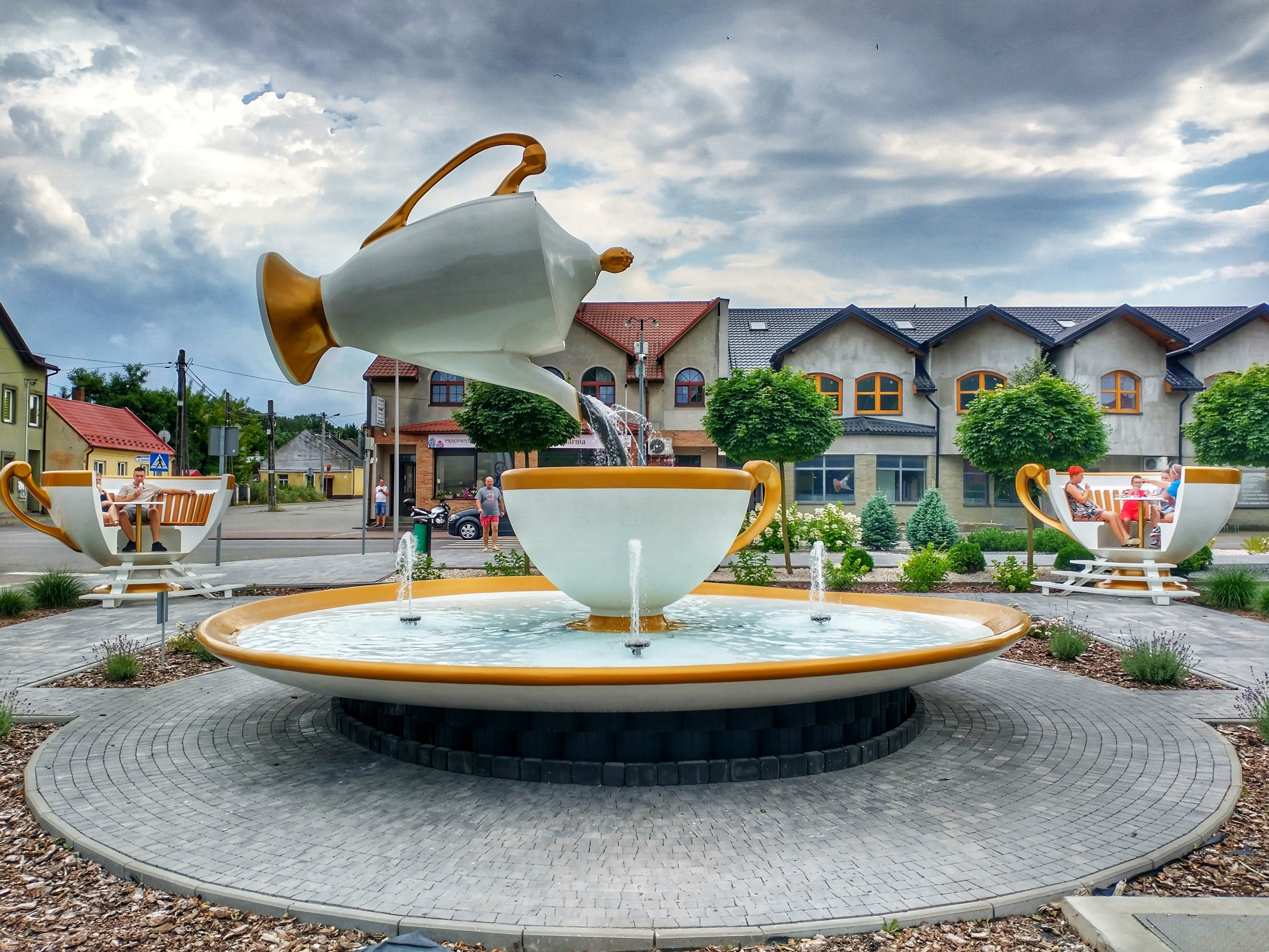
Fountain at the Market Square in Ćmielów

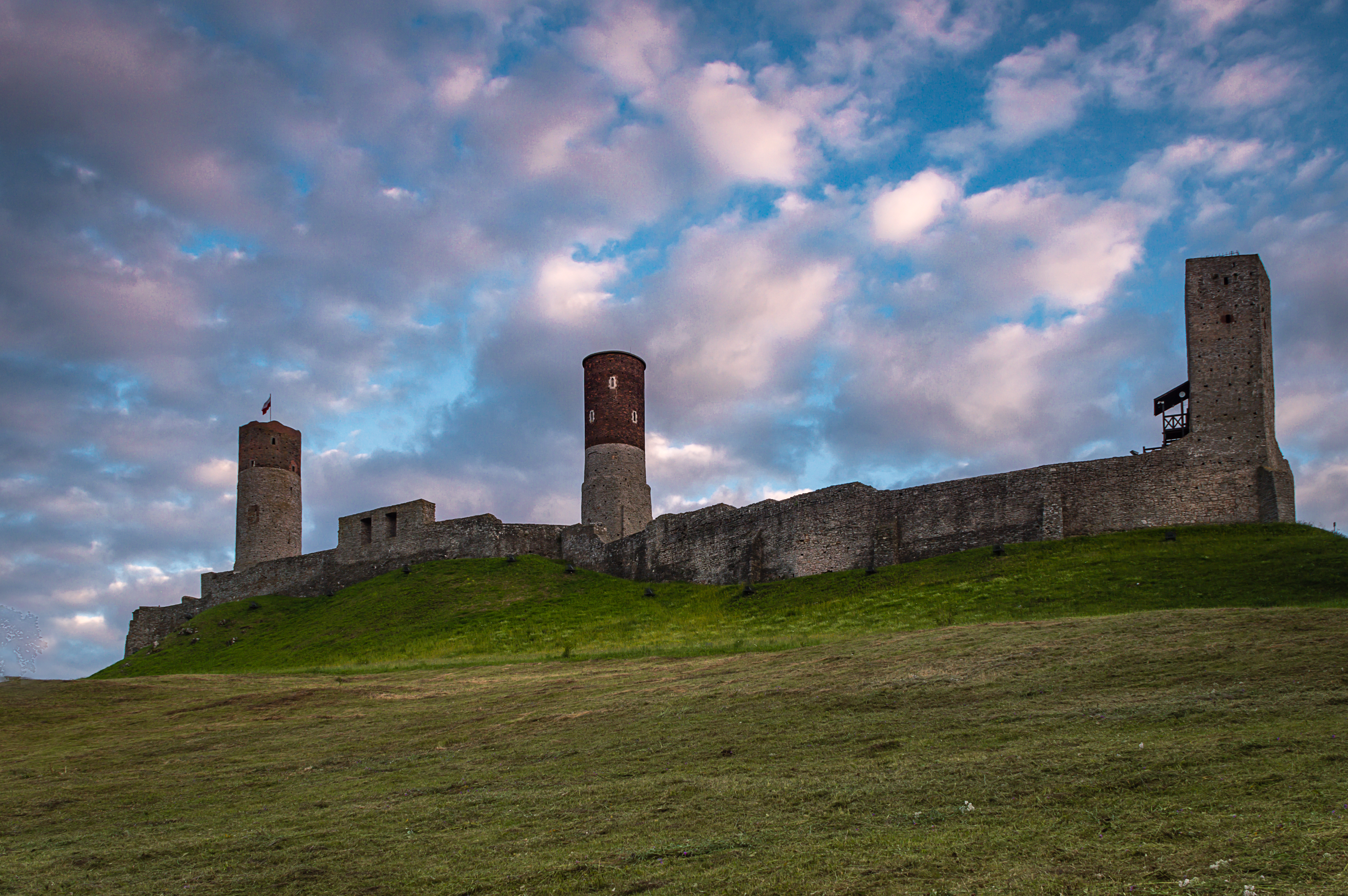
Chęciny Royal Castle

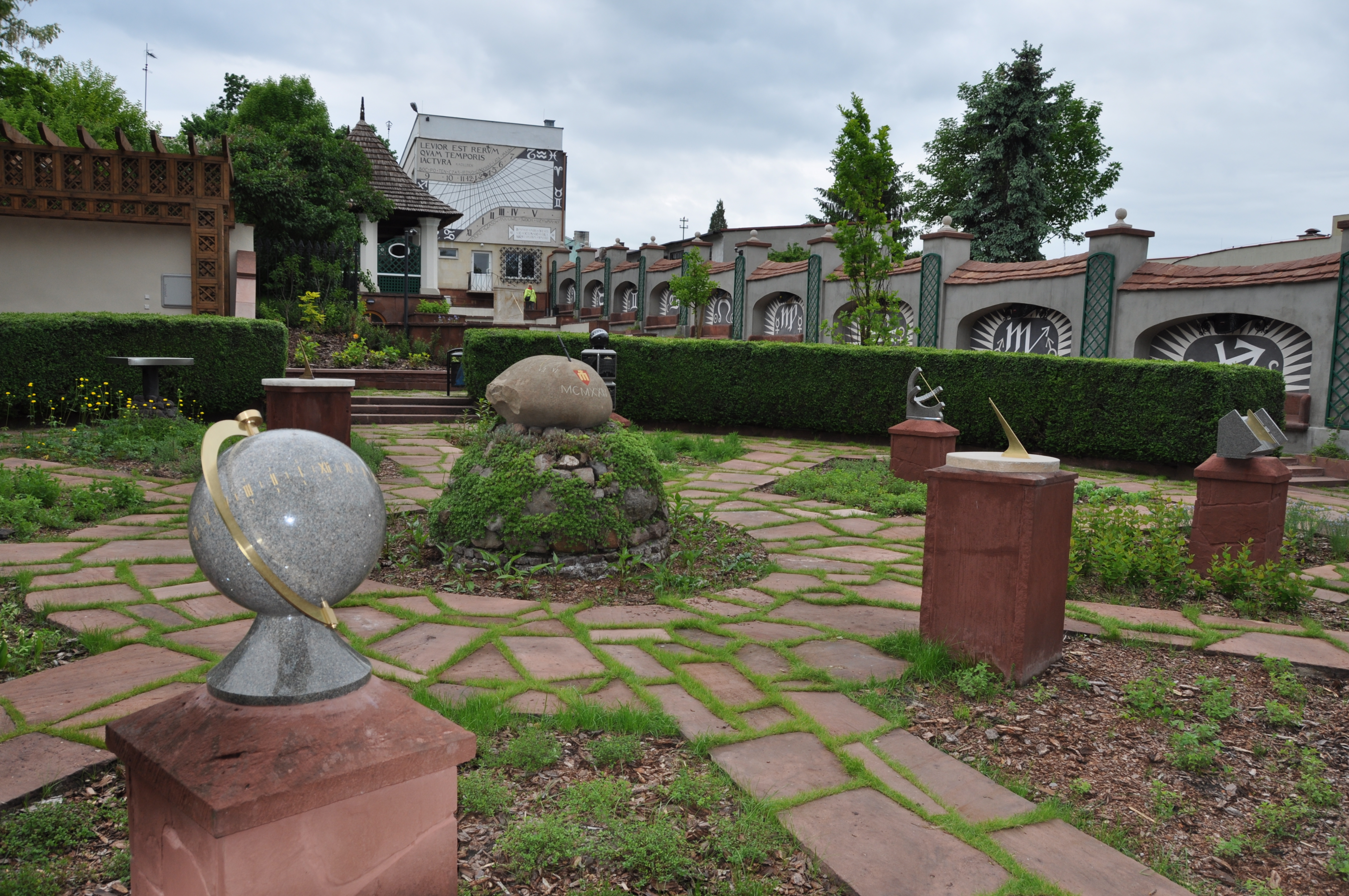
Przypkowscy Clock (Sundial) Museum in Jędrzejów

== Sports ==
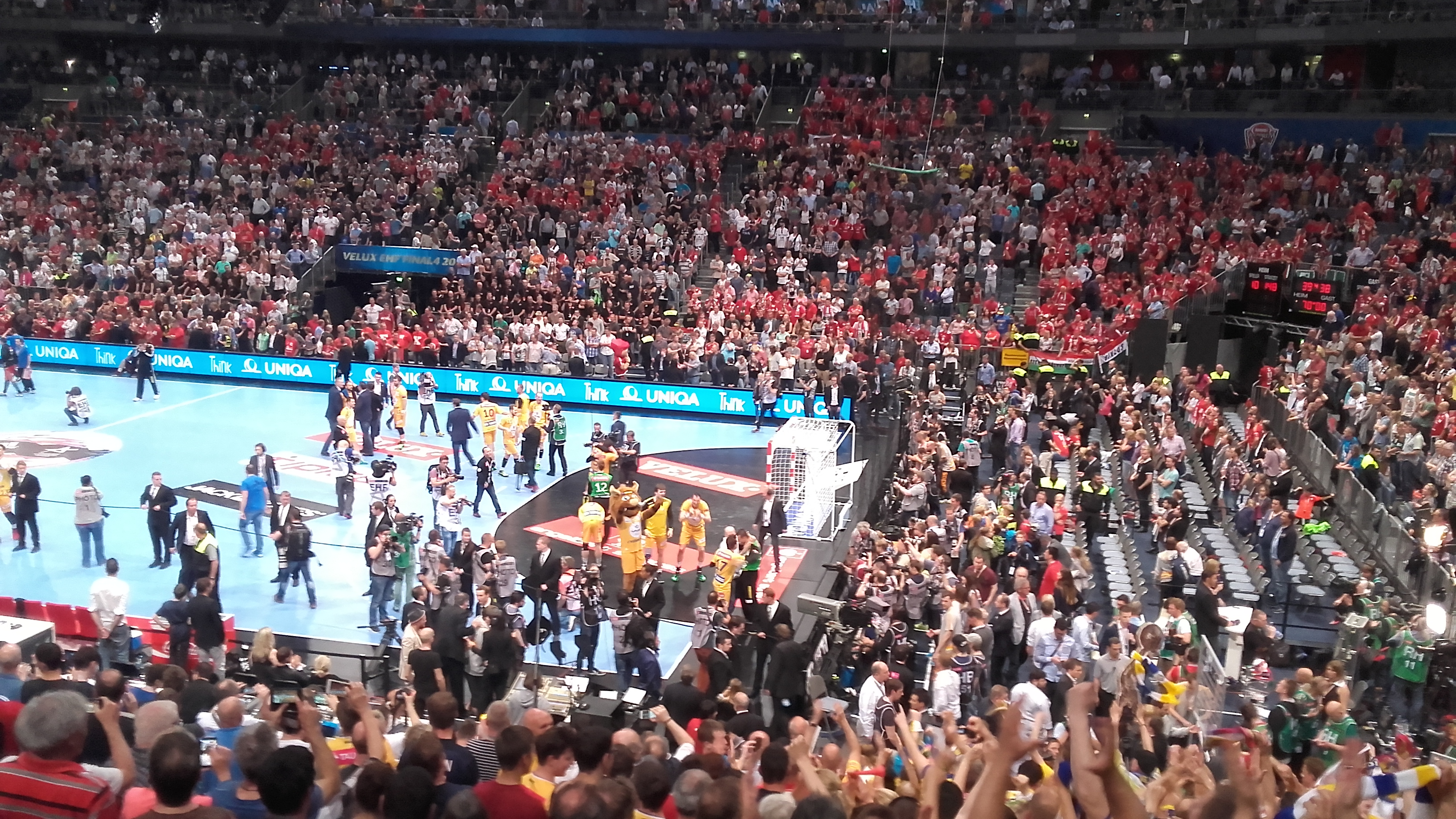
Iskra Kielce celebrating victory in the 2015–16 EHF Champions League

Handball and football enjoy the largest following in the province.

Professional sports teams
Club	Sport	League	Trophies
Barlinek Industria Kielce	Handball (men's)	Superliga	21 Polish Championships; 18 Polish Cups; 1 EHF Champions League (2016)
Korona Kielce	Football (men's)	Ekstraklasa	0
Korona Handball Kielce	Handball (women's)	Liga Centralna Kobiet	0

== Curiosities ==
- In the 16th-17th centuries, Scottish settlers were noted in various towns in the current province, including Busko-Zdrój, Chęciny, Kielce, Koprzywnica, Nowy Korczyn, Opatów, Pacanów, Pińczów, Połaniec, Raków, Sandomierz, Secemin.

== See also ==
- Świętokrzyskie cuisine
- Second Polish Republic's Kielce Voivodeship (1919–1939)
- Lesser Polish Way
