= Drzewica Formation =

Geologic formation in Poland

- Stratigraphic range: Pliensbachian; ~188–183 Ma
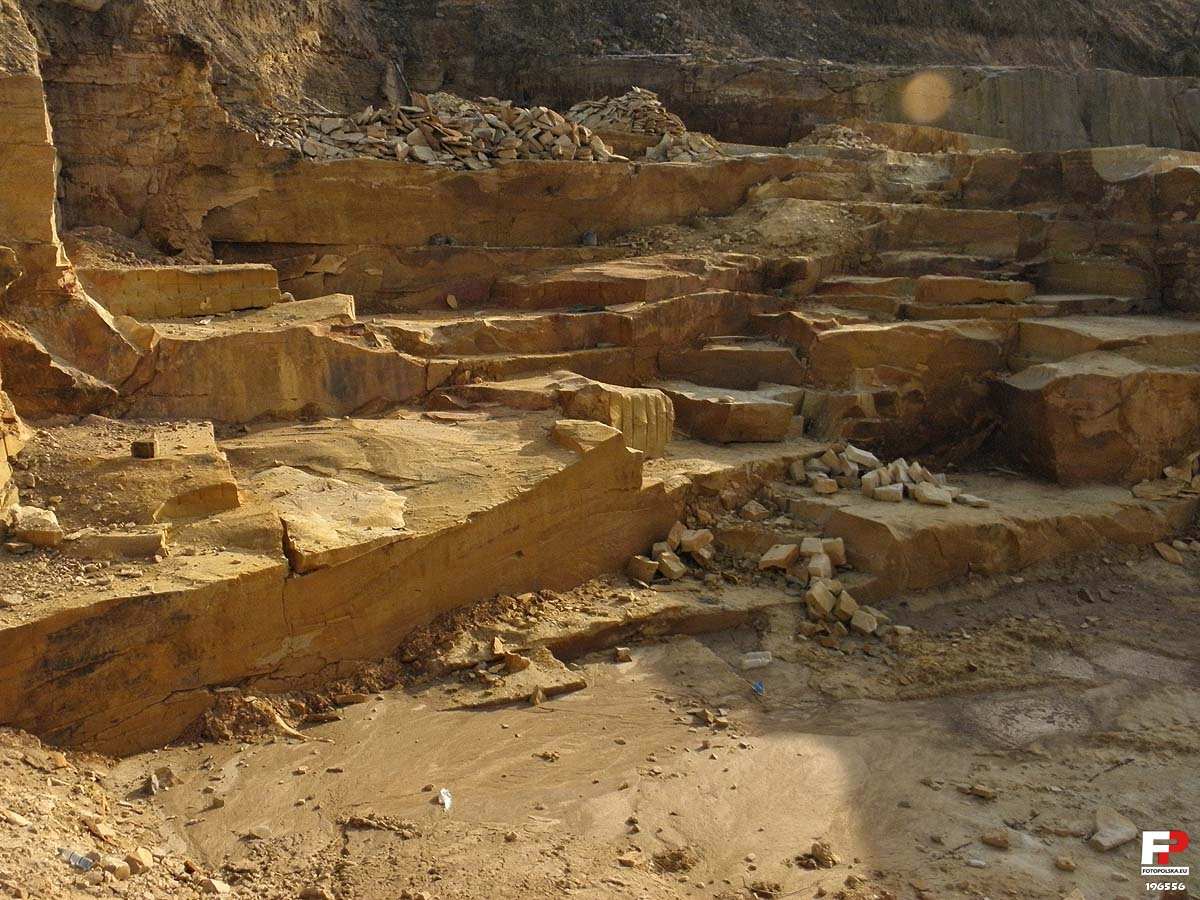
- The Dzikówka Sandstone Quarry outcrop of the formation
- Type: Geological formation
- Unit of: Kamienna Group
- Underlies: Ciechocinek Formation; Borucice Formation
- Overlies: Zagaje Formation; Lobez Formation; Ostrowiec Formation; Gielniów Formation
- Thickness: Up to ~100 m (330 ft)

Lithology
- Primary: Siliciclastic sandstones
- Other: Several types of heteroliths and mudstones

Location
- Region: Szydłowiec, Southern Poland
- Country: Poland
- Extent: Polish Liassic Basin

Type section
- Named for: Drzewica, Poland
- Named by: Karaszewski (as an informal unit)
- Drzewica Formation (Poland) Major Outcrop Location

The Drzewica Formation (also called Drzewica Series, Polish: seria drzewicka gen. serii drzewickiej and in older literature Bronów Series, Polish: seria bronowska or Komorowo Beds, Polish: warstwy komorowskie) is a geologic formation in Poland. It is Pliensbachian in age. Vertebrate fossils have been uncovered from this formation, including dinosaur tracks. The Drzewica Formation is part of the Depositional sequence IV-VII of the late lower Jurassic Polish Basin, with the IV showing the presence of local Alluvial deposits, with possible meandriform deposition origin, dominated in Jagodne and Szydłowiec, while delta system occurred through the zone of the modern Budki. The sequence V shows a reduction of the erosion in the Zychorzyn borehole of the Drzewica Formation, showing changes on the extension of the marine facies, where upper deposits change from Alluvial to Deltaic-Seashore depositional settings. VI-VII facies were recovered on the Brody-Lubienia borehole, with a lower part exposed on the village of Śmiłów that shows a small fall of the Sea level. The stathigraphic setting of the dinosaur tracks reported from the formation suggest a Seashore or Deltaic barrier. Body fossils reported include bivalves, palynology, fossil trunks, roots. Trunks of coniferous wood, especially Cheirolepidiaceae and Araucariaceae trees show the occurrence of vast coniferous forests around the tracksite. The association of forests and dinosaur megafauna on the Pliensbachian suggests also a colder and specially dry ecosystem. Drzewica deposits where in part to be a gigantic shore barrel, setting at the time where the Polish basin sea was at its lowest point. Other related units are Fjerritslev or Gassum Formation (Danish Basin), Hasle & Sorthat Formation (Bornholm), upper Neringa Formation (Lithuania) and abandoned informal units in other regions of Poland: upper Sławęcin Beds (Polish: seria sławęcińska), Wieluń series (Polish: seria wieluńska) or Bronów series.

== Description ==
The Drzewica Formation between Gowarczów and Rozwady, forms sandstone complexes of +10 or so meters, usually uniformly formed, finely less often medium-grained, separated by Silt-sandstone blocks, sandstone-like places or Siltstones. In these sediments there are worm tubules (Ichnofossils), Rhizoids and the remains of Charred plants, sometimes thin carbon inserts. This section on the area of Gowarczów-Rozwady wasn't completely covered, but connects the appearance of the Drzewica Formation strata with several coeval Boreholes: Gowarczów (GW-1 and GW-2), Kuraszków (KP-1 and KP-4), Sielec (A2), Adamów (Al), Kraszków (MG-2), Gielniów (GG-1) and in a few exposures (quarries) from the vicinity of Kraszków and Gielniów. On this region the most complete profile of this formation was obtained in the Sielec Borehole (A2), which was pierced by the geological structure of the outcrop zone, covering the middle and upper section of the Drzewica Formation with a thickness of 146.7 m. Locally, the thickness of this series is estimated at 175–180 m.

=== Profile ===
Stratigraphy on the Bodzanów IG 1 Borehole
Unit	Lithology	Thickness (metres)	Fossil Palynology/Flora	Fossil Fauna
Youngest	sandstones	2630.0–2632.0 m depth on the General Lithological Profile	Non Reported	Non Reported
N1	2.6 m of core, including: 0.7 m-fine grained sandstone, light gray, almost white, solid/compact. 0.8 m-fine grained sandstone, light gray, almost white, with a tabular diagonal layering, emphasized by accumulations of carbonated organic matter and Muscovite. 1.1 m -fine grained sandstone, light gray, almost white, with blurry layering.	2632,0–2638,0 m depth on the General Lithological Profile	Cupressacites subgranulatus (Cupressaceae Conifers); Ischyosporites variegatus (Dicksoniaceae Ferns); Carnisporites granulatus (Selaginellaceae Lycopsids); Taurocusporites verrucatus (Notothyladaceae Bryophytes); Classopollis classoides (Cheirolepidiaceae Conifers); Trachysporites sp. (Pteridophyta Ferns); Tsugaepollenites macroverrucosus (Pinaceae Conifers); Corrugatisporites scanicus (Lygodiaceae Ferns); Deltoidospora minor (Cyatheaceae Ferns); Carbonized vegetable chaff	Non Reported
N_{2}	Downwards lutite turning into mudstones. At a depth of 2638.0–2794.0 m, interpretation based on geophysical measurements and crumb samples	2638,0–2642,0 m depth on the General Lithological Profile	Non Reported	Non Reported
Oldest	sandstones and inverted sandstones, with individual inserts of sandy mudstones	2638,0–2642,0 m depth on the General Lithological Profile	Non Reported	Non Reported

== Paleogeography ==
At the Late Pliensbachian (Margaritatus-Spinatum) several changes occur on the Polish Basin. The last section, latest Raricostatum subzone, there were a series marine transgressive surfaces, linked with the called Pli1 transgressive phase, known thanks to molluscs and ooids, along with an increase of marine macrofauna and microfauna. A marine Ingression filled the Polish basin, depositing marine dark Clay, Mudstone and lenticular Heteroliths, that are abundant on the lower-Middle Pliensbachian Łobez Formation and Poland, where dark-grey marine Claystones appear on the Kaszewy 1 borehole. There was a visible shoreline retreat that ends on the beginning of the Late Pliensbachian Margaritatus Chronozone. After the Pli1, a series of local subordinate retrogradational stratal-pattern architectures indicate the transgressive phase of the sequence Pli2. Pli2 The transgressive phase led to a maximum flooding level at the middle Spinatum. That was known thanks to Ammonites found on an 85 m basin at NW Poland, on the Wolin IG-1 borehole. This transgression also impacted deposition, with 265 m sequences of Mudstones and sandstones in a syndepositional tectonic graben at the Wolin-Recław Zone. After the maximum peak of the flooding basin it followed a regressive phase, characterized by progradational fluvio-deltaic sandstones, like the series of sandstones that recover the major tracksites of the Drzewica Formation, the Śmiłów Quarry Tracksite and the Wólka Karwicka Tracksite, both know from a regression nearshore/barrier lagoonal derived sandstone deposit. The Coeval deposits of Usedom and East Prignitz on Germany contain numerous Glendonites (Calcite pseudomorphs after Ikaite), what lends support to the possibility of a Late Pliensbachian cooling event and polar Glaciation at that time. Mostly of the authors, based on the current scientific quorum and the wide distribution of Glendonites in Upper Pliensbachian strata, tend to support a glacial-derived hypothesis.

The Spinatum regression collides with the worldwide Toarcian Oceanic Anoxic event. The oldest deposits of the sequence (Latest Pliensbachian-Lowermost Toarcian), partly of an age resting on a regional erosional surface, comprise alluvial and deltaic sediments assigned to a number of lithostratigraphic units of local significance. The sequence recovers significant sea-level falls, that are related with the recurrent Late Pliensbachian glaciation, that would be followed at the start of the Toarcian with Global warming and a large scale transgression, recovered locally on the Ciechocinek Formation.

Thanks to data from the Kaszewy 1 borehole levels of 1200 pCO_{2} were recovered, thanks to Plant stomatal index, being the highest amount recovered on the whole Lower Jurassic interval. The studied strata also led to know a great variability in Total Organic Content, interpreted as result of a greater terrestrial biodegradation. This led to knowing that the lower temperatures recovered from the Polish Basin in this interval occurred in the latest Rhaetian/earliest Hettangian, the late Hettangian, early Pliensbachian and especially in the Late Pliensbachian (Stokesi, Gibbosus, Spinatum), being this last the coolest period in the whole Early Jurassic.

== Sedimentological evolution ==
The Formation strata starts on the Polish Jurassic Depositional sequence V, that besides Drzewica area and Budki–Szydłowiec–Jagodne area, is also known from the Brody-Lubienia borehole (with a massive exposure of the sequence V in an operating quarry near Bielowice, the major one along with Skrzynno near Przysucha), that is located on the eastern part of the Świętokrzyskie Mountains region, giving insight into development of Pliensbachian deposits in the marginal parts of this basin. The initial part of this sequence is associated with a local fall of the sea level, where the lower IV level transition exposes with erosion, on locations such as the Zychorzyn borehole (at depth of 96.1 m) on Drzewica. The latter sedimentation is marked with thin deposits from delta-distributary depositional subsystem, that become thicker around the Budki, where in the zone of the Brody-Lubienia borehole an alluvial-meandering channel deposition system developed. After this initial regression there was a local transgression that led to abundance of local trace fossils and the formation of barrier-lagoonal deposits on Budki and in Brody-Lubienia, along with the increased presence of marine bivalves. In the Brody-Lubienia borehole were developed in embayment-lagoon facies. After the major marine transgression there was a visible change on Budki–Szydłowiec–Jagodne, shifting to fluvial discharge continuously moving along the Nowe Miasto–Iłża fault to the NE direction during the Pliensbachian times. At this time on the Jagodne 1 borehole it was deposited the development of a barrier-lagoon linked with a delta.

The Depositional sequence VI starts on the Jagodne 1 borehole with very large Mud clasts, pointing to intensive erosion of the underlying lagoonal sediments, while on the basin center, on the Zychorzyn borehole the erosion on lower sediments was lesser aggressive. The sediments that were deposited at the start of this sequence are uniformly represented by coarse alluvial deposits, interpreted as meandering river with possible conspicuous share of bed load transport. On the Budki 1 borehole series of coarse-grained alluvial package (especially large scale tabular cross-bedding sets dominate and quartz pebbles association), can represent low-sinuosity braided channels. Another transgressive phase on this sequence led to the formation of foreshore/shoreface/barrier deposits, and a local event on the Polish Basin, where there was a rapid drowning of the paleorelief with alluvial valleys and coastal plains, resulting in embayed coastline with detached beach andor barrier ridges. There was equilibrium with the sea level, with periodical little regressions and transgressions. The maximum flooding range of this phase is represented by the Szydłowiec sandstones, developed on a regressive period where on Śmiłów was developed an eolian dune depositional subsystem linked with a barrier-lagoon, know due to the presence of barrier crest eolian deposits with plants buried. In this environment, the major Tracksites of the formation were developed. Linked with the Śmiłów Quarry sandstone appear deltaic deposits on the Brody-Lubienia borehole and on Zychorzyn.

The Depositional sequence VII is the last Pliensbachian major sequence, know especially from the Brody-Lubienia borehole and the continuation of an alluvial portion exposed also at Śmiłów, where an exposure exhibits sequence VI/VII characters, showing that the sea level fall was not so significant, as it was in the base of the previous sequence. This sequence starts with a rise of sea level and quick drowning of the whole area, destroying the previous delta system/marsh subsystem development measured at the Brody-Lubienia borehole, that shows that the amplitude of this transgression was quite high, as is represented by a thickness of 16 m.

There are several Types off Seashore Stratification seen on the Drzewica Formation. Starting with the post-Spinatum regression derived shore prograding cycle, where the nearshore deposits show detailed Hummocky cross-stratification, at the time are covered by thin beach-welded facies showing irregular "massive" bedding and numerous Plant roots penetrating down from the undulated bounding surface. Superimposed are fine grained, very well sorted sandstones with giant tabular Cross-bedding set interpreted as beach (Backshore depositional subsystem) Eolian Dune with complete Plant remains buried in the wind-transported Sand (Mostly, Herbaceous-Built Plants). The Direction of the Wind sedimentation is clearly visible on these deposits, where the stratification of the sand is well oriented. Those deposits are abundant on the Antecki quarry. The most related to the shores, probably barrier-Lagoon and Delta depositional systems are clearly visible on the Smilów Quarry, where the exposure shows different lithofacies and strata, including fine-grained, white and light-grey sandstones with Hummocky cross-stratification, with a series of tabular and trough Cross-bedding sets, probably related to near marine depositional subsystem. A more fine-medium-grained, grey to brownish sandstones also with flat-tabular-horizontal bedding with abundant drifted Plant Fossils and plant remains in situ is considered to be part of a clear foreshore barrier–Eolian depositional subsystem, probably related to a series of Dune fields, related to the Sea Barriers. Kaolinized grey Mudstones with abundant Dispersed plant roots are related to more lagoonal depositional subsystems. The slightly smaller and fine built, brownish and yellow sandstones that show details Cross-bedding are related to a more alluvial deposition, probably from the influence of a local Channel. On the Main Smilów Quarry the dominant shore face depositional subsystem show detailed marks of clear Palaeocurrent directions, dispersed trough Cross-bedding inclinations that point to the West. There have been measurements of the Wave-formed ripple that approximately reflects a shoreline orientation. Thanks to the wave ripple crests orientation and the orientation of fossil tree logs it was indicated an inclination of the inclined tabular Foreset bed continuing across the whole outcrop. These Foreset bed show a more pronounced inclination thanks to seaward-dipping Clinoforms, what reflects the original inclination of a barrier slope, with the sum of palaeocurrent pointing to south-west.

== Economic Resources ==
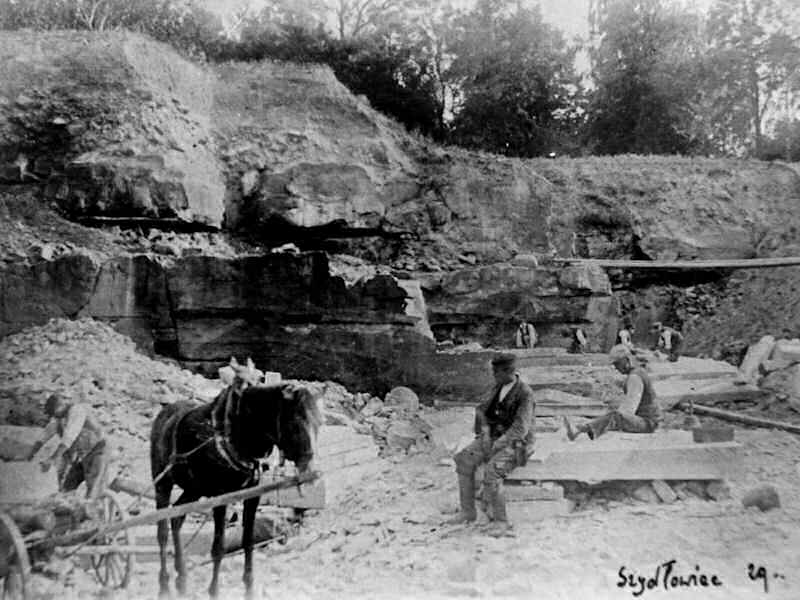
"Pinkiert" quarry sandstone extraction in 1929

Zaosie Anticline-Jeżów Anticline are two of the three structures selected as having the best conditions for geological CO_{2} storage in the Bełchatów region, with several wells drilled. Both the structures are characterized by similar geological feature and petrophysical parameters of rocks, being potential reservoirs. Significant thickness, good reservoir properties and proper depth give sufficient grounds to select the Lower Jurassic sandstone levels of the Drzewica Formation.

Budziszewice-Zaosie structure is one of the potential CO_{2} storage sites for the biggest emitter of that gas in Europe, the Bełchatów Power Plant, with the major and most perspective reservoir located on the Drzewica Formation Strata locally. Archival seismic sections subject to secondary interpretation made it possible for a more accurate mapping of the deep structure of the anticline and its definition as present state of recognition as tectonically continuous. The Major drilling hole was stablished on the top of the upper Pliensbachian, JPl3 (the top of the Drzewica formation of the first potential reservoir), with the top of the Ostrowiec formation (Polish: seria ostrowiecka) as the second potential reservoir. Parametric models of variability were made for the resulting geometrical matrix lithology, contamination, effective porosity and total permeability of the complexes. Several works based on static 3D model recovered effective storage capacity c.a. 10 Mt (during 6 or 30 years of injection depending on hydrodynamic conditions). Other major CO_{2} storage is found on Sierpc anticline ("Upper Sławęcin Beds"), specially on the Sierpc 2 borehole, with measured capacity of 260 tonnes of dihydrogen.

The sandstones of the Drzewica Formation have been object of mining since the Middle Ages, used as key material for the local construction. Two kinds are distinctive, the main Szydłowiec sandstones and the Kunów sandstones, mined on Śmiłów (13th century–recent), Kunów (17th–20th century). It was used by members of the Polish renaissance such as Jan Michałowicz, for some of their most well known pieces, such as the Tomb of Wolski Brothers. Kunów sandstones have also been studied as potential geotourism attractions.

== Fungi ==
Color key: Taxon / Reclassified taxon / Taxon falsely reported as present / Dubious taxon or junior synonym / Ichnotaxon / Ootaxon / Morphotaxon	Notes; Uncertain or tentative taxa are in small text; ~~crossed out~~ taxa are discredited.

Genus	Species	Location	Material	Notes	Images
Xylophagous Fungi	Morphotype A (Aseptae); Morphotype B (Sphaerical); Morphotype C (Sack-shaped); Morphotype D (Transverse septa); Morphotype E (Amerospore); Morphotype F (Phragmospores); Morphotype G (Dictyospores)	Brody-Lubienia borehole.	Fungal Spores; Hyphae-like attachments	Saprophyte fungal Spores from Marine and Deltaic Settings associated with wood and Litter. The frequency of fungal spores on the Polish basin on the Pliensbachian-Toarcian transition is correlated with negative C isotope peaks and enhanced cuticular plant litter accumulation, pointing to climate-driven enhanced decomposition of wood and rapid destruction of terrestrial carbon, which may have played an important role in the aggravation of the Jurassic Greenhouse disaster. Associated with a high rate of organic burial, the presence of Fungal Matter increased on the Uppermost layers of the Drzewica Formation, with a continued deposition between the T-OAE extinction, and several ups and downs on the Ciechocinek Formation, related with local climate and humidity changes. This is rather a reflection of the efficiency of terrestrial biodegradation. Measured increasing of temperature favoured local fungal-mediated decomposition of plant litter, specifically of normally resistant wood. Observed fungal spores represent various morphotypes and resemble superficially other palynogenic detritus, such as sphaerical Prasinophyceae. In some cases spherical fungal spores show structures related to Hyphae attachments.	Spores found on the Polish are mostly from Saprophyte (wood decomposers) fungi, resembling the extant genera like Scutellinia

== Paleofauna ==
Along the Early Jurassic, there was a mostly marginal-marine (mainly Mesohaline), deltaic and continental sedimentation that prevailed in the area of Poland. A marine basin of Polyhaline character conditions occurred mainly in the Pliensbachian, due to a flooding of the Polish Basin. Due to that, Pliensbachian sedimentation in Pomerania developed in a shelf basin that attained depths of about 100 m, below the storm wave base. As the latest Pliensbachian began, the climate changes to a more cold environment, as prove the presence of ice sheets on northern latitude facies of the same age. That led to changes in salinity. The Drzewica Formation was influenced by an ancient swampy-lagoonal sub-system, with Deltaic currents depositing fluvial sediments. The Main Boreholes show eustatic changes on the marine conditions, with a retreat of the sea level, leading to the appearance of vegetation and abundant pollen on the uppermost parts of the formation. The regressive phase of sea level is represented by the Komorowo Beds and Upper Sławęcin Beds along with the own Drzewica Formation. As the level of the sea recovered on the Toarcian, most of the setting turn out to be a bathyal marine bottom. The major outcrop of the formation, found on the Śmiłów Quarry represents a nearshore, deltaic, barrier-lagoonal ecosystem, where the biota left a high report of footprints (+200), with different sizes, that range from small to large animals of various groups. The Smilow Quarry Tracksite is the main outcrop and setting for the Footprints. The footprints are related to mostly lagoon-derived facies, unlike the vegetation, that appears on Deltaic facies. Brackish deposits are relates to Brachiopodans and other molluscs and Limuloid animals. The presence of Late Pliensbachian common ammonoids and several vertebrate clades connects the marine fauna with similar environments of the same age across Europe. The Drzewica Fauna is also, one of the few from the Pliensbachian-Toarcian Anoxic event recorded worldwide, specially referred to the vertebrate fauna reported.

=== Invertebrates ===
==== Ichnofossils ====
Genus	Species	Location	Material	Type	Images
Cochlichnus	C. isp.	Szydłówek quarry; Śmiłów quarry; Podkowiński quarry; Antecki quarry	Traces	Fodichnia	
Conichnus	C. isp.	Szydłówek quarry; Śmiłów quarry; Podkowiński quarry; Antecki quarry	Subcylindrical burrows	Fugichnia; Domichnia	
Diplocraterion	D. parallelum	Kaszewy 1	U-Shaped Burrows	Fodichnia	
Imbrichnus	I. isp.	Szydłówek quarry; Śmiłów quarry; Podkowiński quarry; Antecki quarry	Burrows	Fugichnia	
Isopodichnus	I. isp.	Szydłówek quarry; Śmiłów quarry; Podkowiński quarry; Antecki quarry	Traces	Fodichnia	
Lockeia	L. siliquaria; L. amygdaloides; L. czarnockii	Szydłówek quarry; Śmiłów Quarry; Podkowiński quarry; Antecki quarry; Wólka Karwicka; Brody-Lubienia borehole	Dwelling traces	Cubichnia; Domichnia	
Scalichnus	S. phiale	Szydłówek quarry; Śmiłów quarry; Podkowiński quarry; Antecki quarry	Sac/Bottle shaped burrows	Fugichnia; Domichnia	
Scolicia	S. isp.	Szydłówek quarry; Śmiłów quarry; Podkowiński quarry; Antecki quarry	Traces	Fodichnia	
Skolithos	S. isp.	Szydłówek quarry; Śmiłów quarry; Podkowiński quarry; Antecki quarry	Sac/Bottle shaped burrows	Domichnia	
Spongeliomorpha	S. isp.	Szydłówek quarry; Śmiłów quarry; Podkowiński quarry; Antecki quarry; Brody-Lubienia borehole; Kaszewy 1	Sac/Bottle shaped burrows	Domichnia	

==== Bivalvia ====
Unidentified blackish bivalves were reported from the formation.

Genus	Species	Location	Material	Notes	Images
Anodonta	A. liasokeuperina	Szydłowiec	Shells	Freshwater mussel of the family Unionidae.	
Cardinia	C. philea; C. sp.	Szydłowiec	Shells	Saltwater/blackish cockle of the family Cardiniidae.	
Nuculana	N. zieteni	Szydłowiec	Shells	Saltwater/brackish pointed Nut clam of the family Nuculanidae. Originally described as Dacryomya zieteni.	
Pleuromya	P. forchammeri	Szydłowiec	Shells	Saltwater Clam of the family Pleuromyidae.	
Pronoella	P. cf. elongata	Szydłowiec	Shells	Saltwater/brackish Clam of the family Arcticidae.	

==== Gastropoda ====
Genus	Species	Location	Material	Notes	Images
Viviparus	V. spp.	Szydłowiec sandstones	Shells	Freshwater snail of the family Viviparidae.	Example of extant specimen of Viviparus

==== Ammonites ====
Genus	Species	Location	Material	Notes	Images
Tragophylloceras	T. loscombi	Kaszewy 1 borehole	MUZ.PGI.80.VI.149, single 1,7 cm Shell.	Ammonite of the family Juraphyllitidae inside Ammonoidea. Latest Pliensbachian index fossil, Tragophylloceras is considered to be part of the Mediterranean-Submediterranean fossil region, but it has exceptions, with specimens coming from southern England and northwestern Germany.	Example of Tragophylloceras Fossils

==== Crustacea ====
Genus	Species	Location	Material	Notes	Images
Euestheria	E. brodieana; E. minuta	Podkowiński quarry	Valves	Brackish/Freshwater Clam shrimp (Phyllopodan) of the family Lioestheriidae.	
Liasina	L. lanceolata; L. sp.	Kaszewy 1 borehole; Gutwin borehole; Brody-Lubienia borehole	Docens of Specimens	Brackish Ostracodan of the family Pontocyprididae.	

==== Limuloidea ====
Genus	Species	Location	Material	Notes	Images
Limulidae	Indeterminate	Śmiłów Quarry	Unknown, only Cited	Incertade Sedis	Limulus, example of Limuloid
Limulitella	L. cf. liasokeuperinus	Skarżysko-Kamienna	Head and partial upper body	A marine/brackish Horseshoe crab of the family Limulidae.	

=== Vertebrates ===
==== Fish ====
Genus	Species	Location	Material	Notes	Images
Hybodontoidea	Indeterminate	Szydłowiec sandstones	Teeth	Freshwater/Marine chondrichthyan of the family Hybodontidae.	Restoration of Hybodus
Paleoxyris	P. muensteri	Szydłowiec sandstones	Egg Capsules	A Freshwater/Brackish Shark Egg Capsule, probably from a member of the family of Lonchidiidae or Hybodontidae inside Hybodontiformes. With the study of the contemporaneous flora from Chmielow (Gielniów Formation), Paleoxyris egg capsules were identified from the Szydłowiec sandstones.	
Semionotidae	Indeterminate	Szydłowiec sandstones; Podkowiński quarry	Isolated Teeth	Incertade Sedis	Example of Semionotiform, Semionotus

==== Synapsida ====
Genus	Species	Location	Material	Notes	Images
Brasilichnium	Cf. B. isp.	Śmiłów quarry; Szydłówek quarry	Tracks	Represent tracks from Mammaliformes, member of the ichnofamily Chelichnopodidae, incertae sedis inside Synapsida.	A genus similar to Morganucodon is most probably the best candidate for the local Brasilichnium footprints

==== Crocodylomorpha ====
Genus	Species	Location	Material	Notes	Images
Batrachopus	B. isp.; Cf.B. isp.	Śmiłów quarry; Szydłówek quarry; Wólka Karwicka	Tracks	Terrestrial/Semiacuatic crocodylomorph tracks, type member of the ichnofamily Batrachopodidae, incertae sedis inside Pseudosuchia.	Terrestrial crocodylomorphs such as Protosuchus, were most likely the Batrachopus trackmakers.

==== Theropoda ====
Genus	Species	Location	Material	Notes	Images
Anchisauripus	A. isp. A; A. isp. B; Cf.A. isp.	Szydłówek quarry; Śmiłów quarry; Wólka Karwicka	Footprints	Theropod tracks, type member of the ichnofamily Anchisauripodidae, incertae sedis inside Neotheropoda. Assigned to Coelophysidae-alike dinosaurs.	Anchisauripus footprints belong to a genus similar to Procompsognathus
Eubrontes	E. isp.; Cf.E. isp.	Szydłówek quarry; Śmiłów quarry	Footprints	Theropod tracks, type member of the ichnofamily Eubrontidae, incertae sedis inside Theropoda. Eubrontes' is related to the Genus Dilophosaurus, representing a basal Neotheropods. There is a distinctive crouching theropod trace assigned to Eubrontes plexus, suggested a feather ingument on Dilophosauroids or relatives	Model nicknamed "Dyzio", who represents a feathered reconstruction based on Drzewica and North American finds
Grallator	G. ispp.; Cf.G. isp.	Śmiłów quarry; Szydłówek quarry; Wólka Karwicka	Footprints	Theropod tracks, member of the ichnofamily Eubrontidae, incertae sedis inside Neotheropoda. The footprints from Smilow are small-sized, tridactyl and relatively narrow. forms Assigned to Coelophysidae-alike dinosaurs. Small to medium slender primitive predatory dinosaurs, related with neotheropods such as Camposaurus or Dracoraptor.	Grallator footprints belong to a genus similar to Camposaurus
Kayentapus	K. ispp.; Cf.K. isp.	Szydłówek quarry; Śmiłów quarry	Footprints	Theropod tracks, member of the ichnofamily Eubrontidae, incertae sedis inside Neotheropoda.	
Megalosauripus	M. isp.	Szydłówek quarry	Footprints	Theropod tracks, member of the ichnofamily Eubrontidae, incertae sedis inside Theropoda. The footprints found on Drzewica seem even larger because of their large metatarsophalangeal area, which is often observed in the large theropod footprints from the post-Liassic strata.	Megalosauripus footprints can belong to a large relative of Chuandongocoelurus
Plesiornis	cf. P. isp.	Szydłówek quarry	Footprints	Theropod Tracks, member of the ichnofamily Anchisauripodidae, incertae sedis inside Theropoda.	
Stenonyx	S. isp.	Szydłówek quarry	Footprints	Theropod Tracks, member of the ichnofamily Anchisauripodidae, incertae sedis inside Theropoda. Stenonyx matches with specimens found on the also Pliensbachian Hasle Formation, linking Southern Sweden, Bornholm and Poland, contiguous during the Early Jurassic and dinosaurs could thus freely roam this large area.	

==== Sauropodomorpha ====
Genus	Species	Location	Material	Notes	Images
Parabrontopodus	P. ispp.	Szydłówek quarry; Śmiłów quarry	Footprints	Sauropod tracks, type member of the ichnofamily Parabrontopodidae, incertae sedis inside Sauropodomorpha. Two different casts of footprints of primitive Sauropods.	Local Parabrontopodus resemble the feet of the genus Barapasaurus

==== Ornithischia ====
Genus	Species	Location	Material	Notes	Images
Anomoepus	A. ispp.; Cf.A. isp.	Szydłówek quarry; Śmiłów quarry	Footprints	Ornithischian tracks, member of the ichnofamily Anomoepodidae, incertae sedis inside Neornithischia.	Stormbergia matches with the bodyplan assigned to the Anomoepus trackmaker
Moyenisauropus	M. isp.; Cf.M. isp.	Szydłówek quarry; Śmiłów quarry; Wólka Karwicka	Footprints	Thyreophoran tracks, type member of the ichnofamily Moyenisauropodidae, incertae sedis inside Neornithischia. The tracks adscribed resemble basal Thyreorphora feet. The tracks related to the genus are vinculated with genera such as Scelidosaurus, whose fossils have been found on Pliensbachian strata of England.	Scelidosaurus matches with the bodyplan assigned to the Moyenisauropus trackmaker

== Plants ==
There are traces of root plants with numerous plant remains, some of them vertically preserved, and on this basis he derived a possible dune-related origin of these sediments. The plants in the growth position were present at the bases of aeolian sandstone bodies, up to 2 m thick, which wedge out laterally and are covered by argillaceous strata of coastal lagoon origin with drifted plant remains. Mostly of the plant remains are composed by rhizoids and undeterminable fragments, recovered at the Szydłowiec sandstones, Śmiłów and Mirzec, near Starachowice. More recent studies suggest an environment of shallow seafront and beach, which of course does not exclude the presence of Aeolian zones there. Lithofacies on the Smilów Quarry shows slightly inclined beach forests and abundant plant roots in a series of barrier foreshore, backshore and/or aeolian dune facies, that include even plants buried in whole dunes, while drifted plant fossils and tree logs occur on the main depositional surface. This inclined surface exposes most likely a long period of non deposition and washed plants, recovering at the same time the original tilt of the local beach. Local coals at Kaszewy-1 in abundance and polycyclic aromatic hydrocarbon. Petrogenics are more abundant on the local coal samples than the Pyrolytic, what can suggest that these last ones may not reflect particularly local high levels of Wildfire activity. Apparently, the Kaszewy-1 borehole did not experience increased wildfire activity, but instead that the fine fossil charcoal abundance and Pyrolytics concentration records have shown a more clear regional wildfire signal. The fossil charcoal abundance and geochemical data from Pliensbachian and Toarcian samples show evidence of at least four, and possible another two, levels of increased wildfire activity, and that these can be grouped into two larger periods of increased activity.

Palynologically belongs to the Horstisporites planatus (Pl) Zone (Upper Sinemurian – Pliensbachian), determined by the appearance of the indicator species Horisporites planatus (Selaginellaceae) and The upper limit of the level is marked by the appearance of continuous occurrences of Paxillitriletes phyllicus (Isöetaceae), indicating more humid conditions, and Erlansonisporites sparassis (Selaginellaceae). This level has a series of characteristic megaspores, such as Minerisporites institus (Isöetaceae) and Hughesisporites pustulatus (Lycophyta) and on a minor ratio, rare occurrences of Hughesisporites planatus recorded even above the level range.

The Drzewica Formation palynoflora is recovered mostly on the Gutwin and Brody-Lubienia boreholes, and includes the next plant groups: Bryophyta, Lycopodiaceae, Equisetaceae, Selaginellaceae, Cyatheaceae, Dipteridaceae, Dicksoniaceae, Gleicheniaceae, Matoniaceae, Osmundaceae, Schizeaceae, Peltaspermaceae, Taxodiaceae, Cheirolepidiaceae, Araucariaceae, Podocarpaceae, Pinaceae, Gnetales, Cycadidae, Bennettitales and Ginkgoales. In between all the taxa, Pollen from Seed Ferns and Conifers dominate over miospores, indicating a relatively dry ecosystem. Freshwater algae miospores are known (Botryococcus sp., Cymatiosphaera sp.), as well Paleozoic palynoremains washed from uplands (Walchia sp., Pseudowalchia biangulina, Ullmannia frumentaria, Florinites antiquus, etc.), what indicate a clear active river influx, yet has also evidence of marine ingressions due to the presence of saltwater acritarchs (Psophosphaera coniferoides, Leiosphaeridia sp.).

=== Megaflora ===
The Lublin Upland fluvial sandstones contain diverse types of fossil flora, associated genera and species only with Lower Jurassic sediments. Originally, while studying the Carboniferous flora from the boreholes in the area of the planned Bogdanka Coal Mine, appeared typical flora in similar to Jurassic formations. The age of the plant material was not determined concretely until 2020, where was recovered as being Pliensbachian-Toarcian in age, with the flora representing an arid environment, more probably Pliensbachian, that is covered locally by the Drzewica Formation. The Brody-Lubienia borehole is abundant on terrestrial Palynomorphs (know due to the presence of C29 Diasterenes, >70%), but also has high abundances of aquatic derived biomass. Even with that, there is a clear consensus with the more terrestrial character of the sediments from Brody-Lubienia, expressed by the frequent occurrence of plant roots and paleosol horizons. This also is recovered on the rate of MTTCs (mono-, di- and tri-methyl-trimethyltridecyl-chromanes) where higher indices at Brody-Lubienia indicate lower salinities and a stronger influx of riverine freshwater. The environment was probably Dry, developing flora on the near Freshwater influx settings. The Lublin Flora is linked with the flowing waters from the East. Lublin lias is dominated by cycads and Bennetites Ginkgoales and seed ferns occur sporadically, all on a conglomerate with numerous species occurs in the bottom, where the deposits are filled with of coal, mudstone, sandstone and clay siderite (reworked from the Carboniferous), as well as pebbles from Devonian limestones. Vegetation mostly grew outside the sedimentation area, as well as on shores and shallows.

At the Śmiłów Quarry, plant remains are known, and are interpreted as derived from an aeolian rework, with the plants buried in growth position by barrier crest aeolian dunes. Szydłówek quarry host also a nearshore-foreshore-backshore/eolian setting, where the flora is dominated by woody trunks, plant root moulds and impressions of drifted woody trunks, that suggest the presence of large coniferous forests around the Szydłówek tracksite. Plants here thrive on the foredune are exposed to salt spray, strong wind, and burial by blowing and accumulating sand.

Genus	Species	Stratigraphic position	Material	Notes	Images
Anomozamites	A. cf. gracilis	Borehole L-95 near Łęczna	Pinnae	Affinities with the Bennettitales.	
Baiera	B. digitata; B. sp.	Borehole L-95 near Łęczna; Kaszewy 1	Leaves/Cuticles	Affinities with the Ginkgoaceae inside Ginkgoidae.	
Caytonia	C. sp	Lublin Coal Basin	Ovulate Structure	Affinities with the Caytoniaceae inside Caytoniales.	
Czekanowskia	C. sp.	Kaszewy 1	Cuticles	Affinities with the Czekanowskiales inside Ginkgoopsida. This Genus is related with relatively drier-cooler conditions.	
Ginkgoites	G. sp.	Kaszewy 1	Cuticles	Affinities with the Ginkgoaceae inside Ginkgoidae. Is related with relatively warmer and humid conditions.	
Hirmeriella	H. sp.	Borehole L-95 near Łęczna (Lublin Coal Basin)	Leaves	Affinities with the Cheirolepidiaceae inside Pinales.	
Matonia	M. braunii	Podkowiński Quarry	Pinnae/Fronds	Affinities with Matoniaceae inside Pteridophyta. Matonia braunii represents the second major plant fossil identified on the Drzewica formation Dunar settings, it probably formed monotypic stands on coastal dunes, suggesting a wide ecological amplitude that extant related ferns.	
Neocalamites	N. hoernensis	Podkowiński Quarry	Stems	Affinities with Calamitaceae inside Equisetopsida. A common horsetail on the Liassic of Europe.	
Nilssonia	N. compta; N. orientalis; N. brevis; N. polymorpha; N. sp.	Borehole L-95 near Łęczna	Pinnae	Affinities with the Cycadeoidaceae inside Bennettitales. The most abundant plant macrofossil locally, and the most diverse found on the Lublin coals.	
Nilssoniopteris	N. major; N. vittata	Borehole L-95 near Łęczna	Pinnae	Affinities with the Bennettitales.	
Otozamites	O. beani; O. graphicus	Borehole L-95 near Łęczna	Pinnae	Affinities with the Bennettitales.	
Pachypteris	P. lanceolata; P. rhomboidalis	Lublin Coal Basin	Pinnae	Affinities with the Peltaspermales.	
Pseudotorellia	P. sp.	Kaszewy 1	Cuticles	Affinities with the Pseudotorelliaceae inside Ginkgoopsida. This Genus is related with relatively drier-cooler conditions.	
Swedenborgia?	S.? sp.	Śmiłów Quarry	Complete Plant	Affinities with Krassiloviaceae inside Voltziales. A problematical plant that has been reported only on the Formation, this taxon has a morphology that resembles Schizeacean ferns (Specially Schizaea pectinata), but also that of the Voltziales Aethophyllum stipulare from Anisian of France. It was proposed as a specimen of Swedenborgia on a revision of the specimens of the Hettangian from also Poland.	
Pterophyllum	P. sp.	Borehole L-95 near Łęczna	Pinnae	Affinities with the Williamsoniaceae.	
Sagenopteris	S. sp	Borehole L-95 near Łęczna	Pinnae	Affinities with the Caytoniaceae inside Caytoniales.	
Sphenobaiera	S. sp.	Kaszewy 1	Cuticles	Affinities with the Ginkgoaceae inside Ginkgoidae. Is related with relatively warmer and humid conditions.	
Stenopteris	S. (Rhaphidopteris?) duetschii	Lublin Coal Basin	Pinnae	Affinities with the Umkomasiaceae.	
Weltrichia	W. spectabilis	Lublin Coal Basin	Bennetite "Flower"	Affinities with the Cycadeoidaceae inside Bennettitales.	

== See also ==
- List of fossiliferous stratigraphic units in Poland
- List of dinosaur-bearing rock formations
- Blue Lias, England
- Charmouth Mudstone Formation, England
- Sorthat Formation, Denmark
- Hasle Formation, Denmark
- Zagaje Formation, Poland
- Ciechocinek Formation, Poland
- Borucice Formation, Poland
- Rotzo Formation, Italy
- Saltrio Formation, Italy
- Moltrasio Formation, Italy
- Marne di Monte Serrone, Italy
- Calcare di Sogno, Italy
- Podpeč Limestone, Slovenia
- Coimbra Formation, Portugal
- El Pedregal Formation, Spain
- Fernie Formation, Canada
- Whiteaves Formation, British Columbia
- Navajo Sandstone, Utah
- Aganane Formation, Morocco
- Tafraout Group, Morocco
- Azilal Formation, Morocco
- Budoš Limestone, Montenegro
- Kota Formation, India
- Cañadón Asfalto Formation, Argentina
- Los Molles Formation, Argentina
- Kandreho Formation, Madagascar
- Elliot Formation, South Africa
- Clarens Formation, South Africa
- Evergreen Formation, Australia
- Cattamarra Coal Measures, Australia
- Hanson Formation, Antarctica
- Mawson Formation, Antarctica
