= Libiszów =

Libiszów may refer to the following villages in Poland:

- Libiszów, Lublin Voivodeship (east Poland)
- Libiszów, Łódź Voivodeship (central Poland)

See also: Libiszów-Kolonia
