= Budy Brodzkie =

- Village
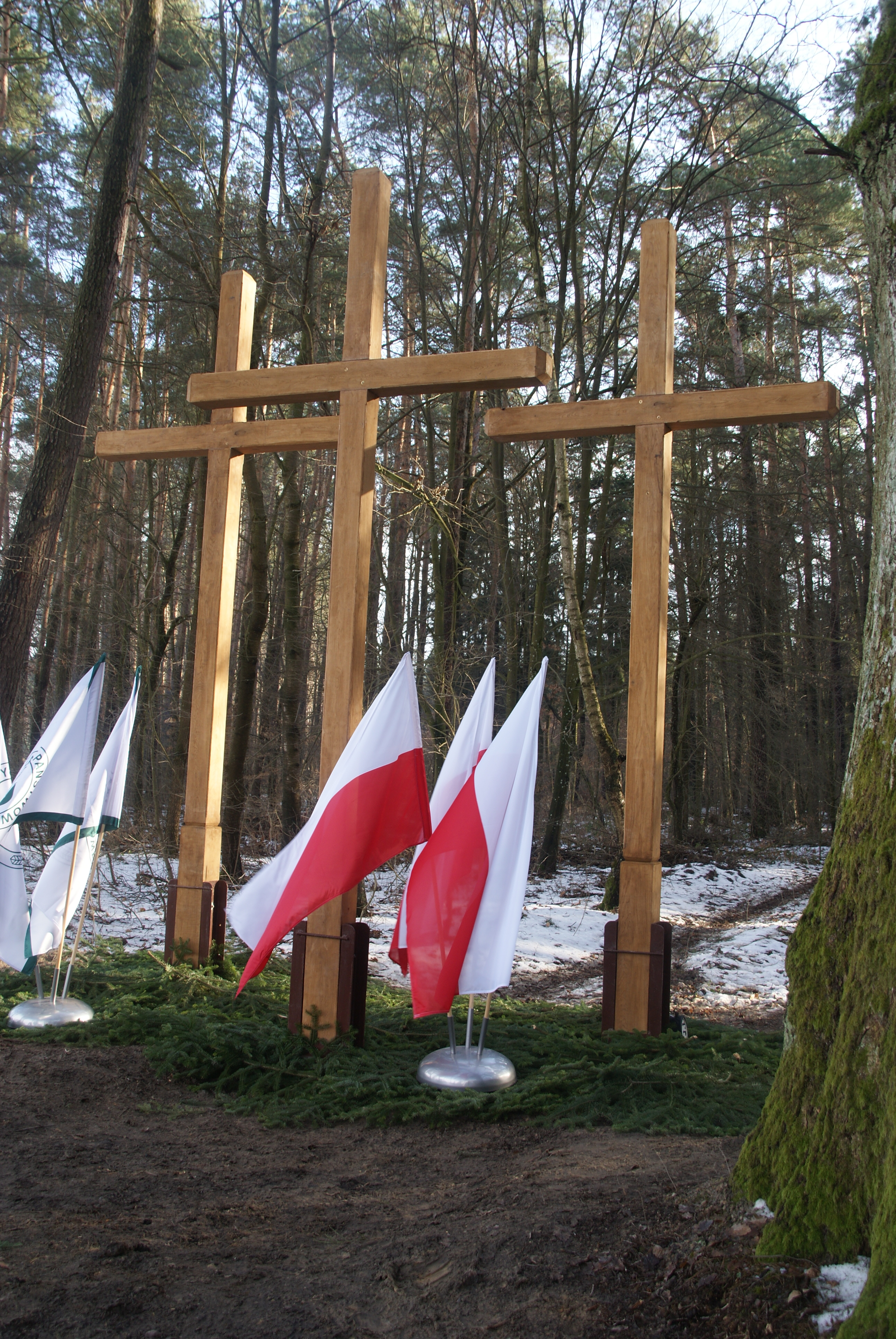

- Location within Poland
- Coordinates: 51°2′31″N 21°13′49″E
- Country: Poland
- Voivodeship: Świętokrzyskie
- County: Starachowice
- Gmina: Brody
- Population: 157

Budy Brodzkie [ˈbudɨ ˈbrɔt͡skʲɛ] is a village in the administrative district of Gmina Brody, within Starachowice County, Świętokrzyskie Voivodeship, in south-central Poland. It lies approximately 2 km (1 mi) north-east of Brody, 12 km (7 mi) east of Starachowice, and 47 km (29 mi) east of the regional capital Kielce.
