= Młynek, Starachowice County =

Młynek
- Village
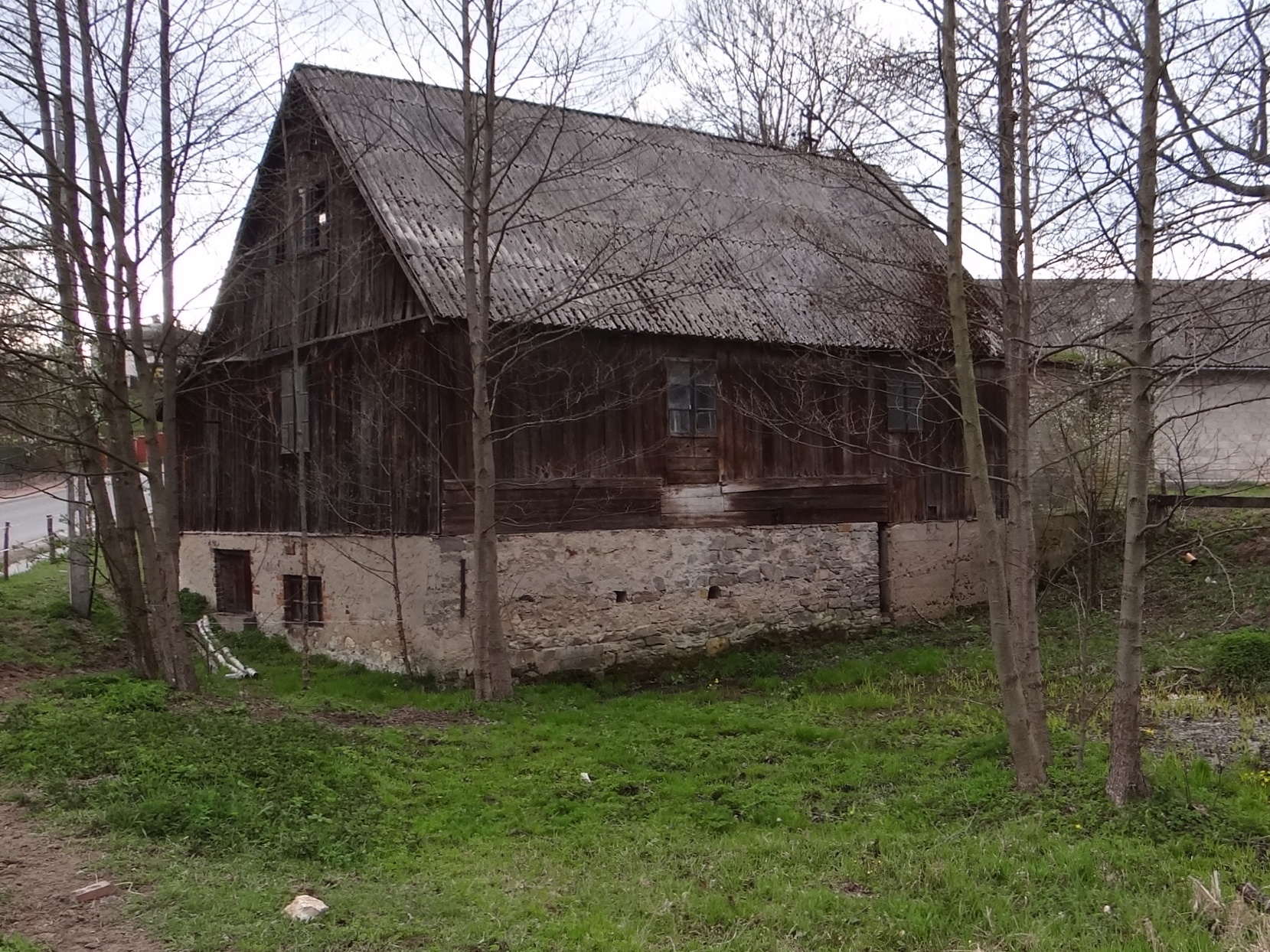

- Location within Poland
- Coordinates: 51°2′6″N 21°11′49″E
- Country: Poland
- Voivodeship: Świętokrzyskie
- County: Starachowice
- Gmina: Brody
- Population: 915

Młynek [ˈmwɨnɛk] is a village in the administrative district of Gmina Brody, within Starachowice County, Świętokrzyskie Voivodeship, in south-central Poland. It lies approximately 2 km (1 mi) north-west of Brody, 10 km (6 mi) east of Starachowice, and 45 km (28 mi) north-east of the regional capital Kielce.

There is a dam close to the Młynek.
