= Jabłonna, Świętokrzyskie Voivodeship =

Jabłonna
- Village
- Location within Poland
- Coordinates: 50°59′21″N 21°8′55″E
- Country: Poland
- Voivodeship: Świętokrzyskie
- County: Starachowice
- Gmina: Brody
- Population: 363

Jabłonna [jaˈbwɔnna] is a village in the administrative district of Gmina Brody, within Starachowice County, Świętokrzyskie Voivodeship, in south-central Poland. It lies approximately 7 km (4 mi) south-west of Brody, 9 km (6 mi) south-east of Starachowice, and 40 km (25 mi) east of the regional capital Kielce.
