= Bór Kunowski =

- Village
- Location within Poland
- Coordinates: 51°1′19″N 21°16′7″E
- Country: Poland
- Voivodeship: Świętokrzyskie
- County: Starachowice
- Gmina: Brody
- Population: 213

Bór Kunowski (Polish pronunciation: [ˈbur kuˈnɔfskʲi]) is a village in the administrative district of Gmina Brody, within Starachowice County, Świętokrzyskie Voivodeship, in south-central Poland. It lies approximately 4 km (2 mi) east of Brody, 15 km (9 mi) east of Starachowice, and 49 km (30 mi) east of the regional capital Kielce.
