= Zameczek =

Zameczek may refer to the following places:

- Zameczek, Łódź Voivodeship (central Poland)
- Zameczek, Masovian Voivodeship (east-central Poland)
- Zameczek, Olsztyn County in Warmian-Masurian Voivodeship (north Poland)
- Zameczek, Pisz County in Warmian-Masurian Voivodeship (north Poland)
