= Lipie, Starachowice County =

Lipie
- Village
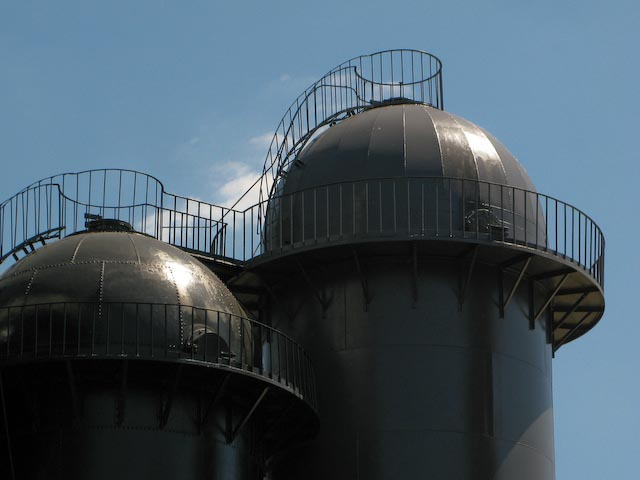

- Location within Poland
- Coordinates: 51°4′18″N 21°7′34″E
- Country: Poland
- Voivodeship: Świętokrzyskie
- County: Starachowice
- Gmina: Brody
- Population: 530
- Website: http://www.lipie.go.pl/

Lipie [ˈlipjɛ] is a village in the administrative district of Gmina Brody, within Starachowice County, Świętokrzyskie Voivodeship, in south-central Poland. It lies approximately 9 km (6 mi) north-west of Brody, 5 km (3 mi) north-east of Starachowice, and 42 km (26 mi) north-east of the regional capital Kielce.
