= Henryk, Świętokrzyskie Voivodeship =

Henryk
- Village
- Location within Poland
- Coordinates: 51°2′53″N 21°9′25″E
- Country: Poland
- Voivodeship: Świętokrzyskie
- County: Starachowice
- Gmina: Brody
- Population: 120

Henryk [ˈxɛnrɨk] is a village in the administrative district of Gmina Brody, within Starachowice County, Świętokrzyskie Voivodeship, in south-central Poland. It lies approximately 5 km (3 mi) north-west of Brody, 7 km (4 mi) east of Starachowice, and 43 km (27 mi) north-east of the regional capital Kielce.
