= Rudnik, Starachowice County =

Rudnik
- Village
- Location within Poland
- Coordinates: 51°0′12″N 21°13′43″E
- Country: Poland
- Voivodeship: Świętokrzyskie
- County: Starachowice
- Gmina: Brody
- Population: 373

Rudnik (Polish pronunciation: [ˈrudɲik]) is a village in the administrative district of Gmina Brody, within Starachowice County, Świętokrzyskie Voivodeship, in south-central Poland. It lies approximately 3 km (2 mi) south of Brody, 13 km (8 mi) south-east of Starachowice, and 45 km (28 mi) east of the regional capital Kielce.
