= Gmina Brody =

Gmina Brody may refer to either of the following rural administrative districts in Poland:

- Gmina Brody, Świętokrzyskie Voivodeship
- Gmina Brody, Lubusz Voivodeship
