= Różanna =

Różanna may refer to the following places:

- Różanna, Bydgoszcz County in Kuyavian-Pomeranian Voivodeship (north-central Poland)
- Różanna, Świecie County in Kuyavian-Pomeranian Voivodeship (north-central Poland)
- Różanna, Łódź Voivodeship (central Poland)
- Różanna, Masovian Voivodeship (east-central Poland)
- Różanna, Greater Poland Voivodeship (west-central Poland)
