= Adamów, Starachowice County =

Village in Świętokrzyskie Voivodeship, Poland

Adamów
- Village
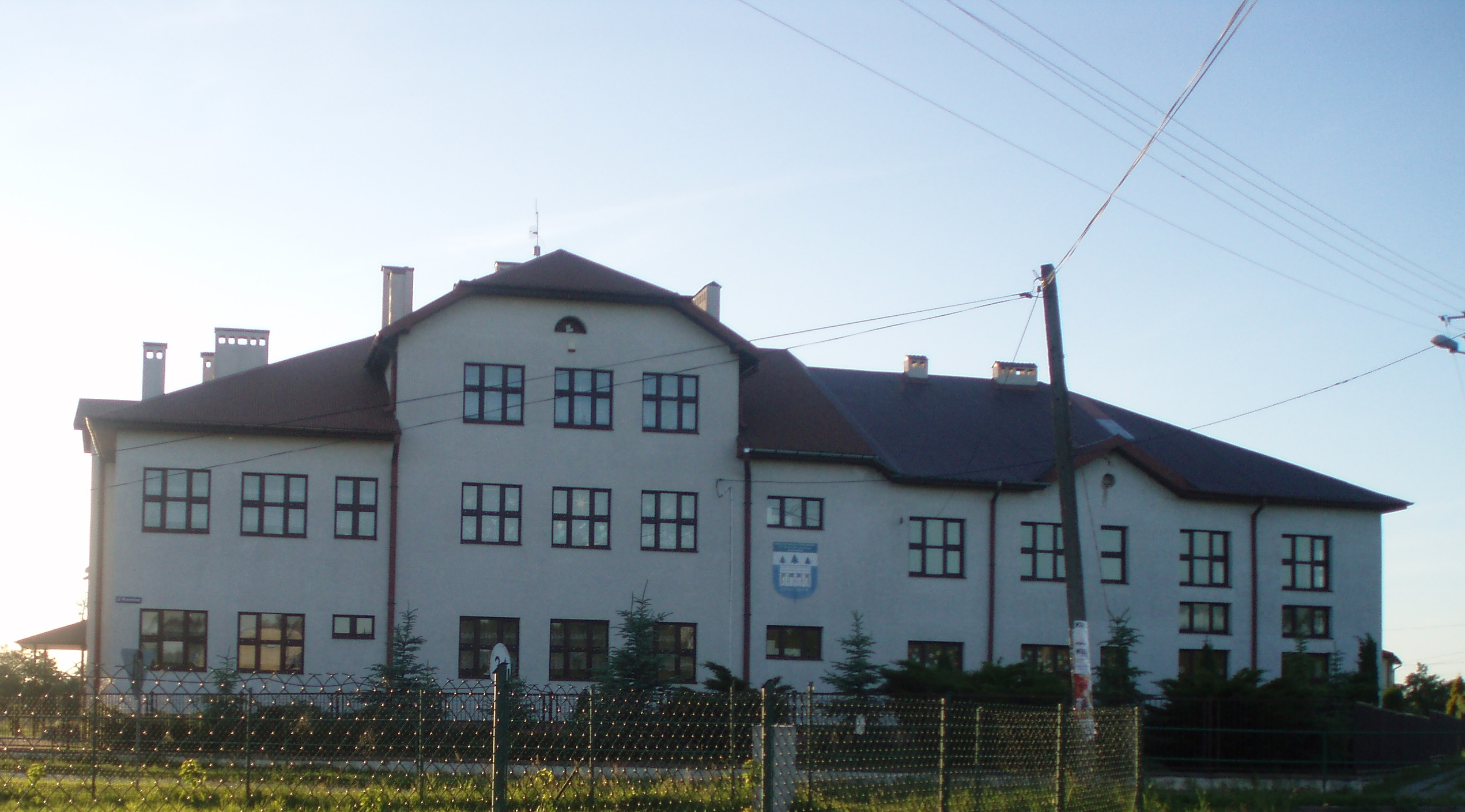
- School

- Location within Poland
- Coordinates: 51°1′33″N 21°9′24″E
- Country: Poland
- Voivodeship: Świętokrzyskie
- County: Starachowice
- Gmina: Brody
- Population: 883

Adamów [aˈdamuf] is a village in the administrative district of Gmina Brody, within Starachowice County, Świętokrzyskie Voivodeship, in south-central Poland. It lies approximately 5 kilometres (3.1 mi) west of Brody, 7 kilometres (4.3 mi) south-east of Starachowice, and 42 kilometres (26 mi) north-east of the regional capital Kielce.
