= Krynki, Świętokrzyskie Voivodeship =

Krynki
- Village
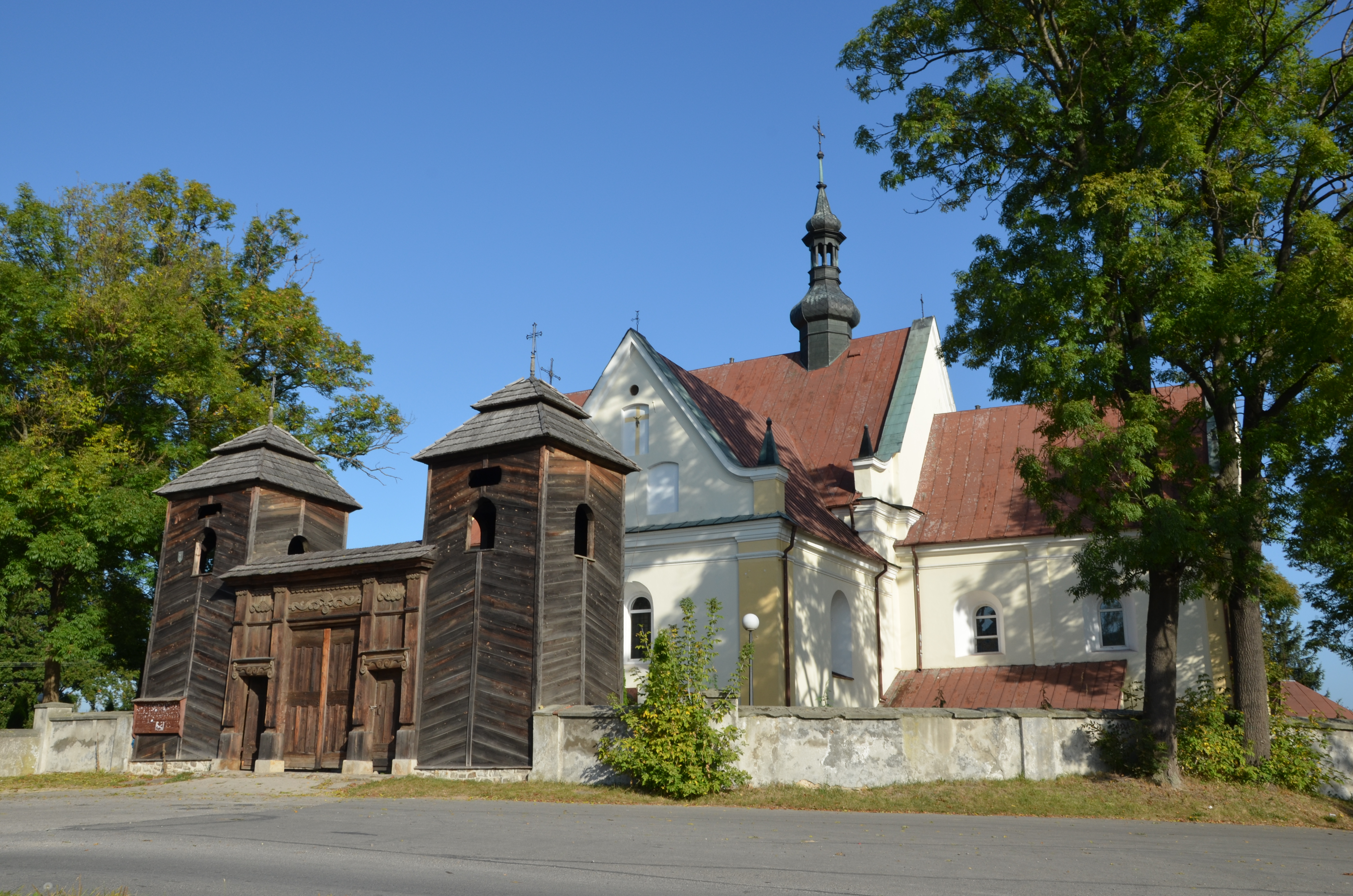
- Catholic church

- Location within Poland
- Coordinates: 51°0′45″N 21°12′24″E
- Country: Poland
- Voivodeship: Świętokrzyskie
- County: Starachowice
- Gmina: Brody
- Population: 1,273

Krynki ([ˈkrɨnki]) is a village in the administrative district of Gmina Brody, within Starachowice County, Świętokrzyskie Voivodeship, in south-central Poland. It lies approximately 2 km (1 mi) south-west of Brody, 11 km (7 mi) south-east of Starachowice, and 44 km (27 mi) east of the regional capital Kielce.

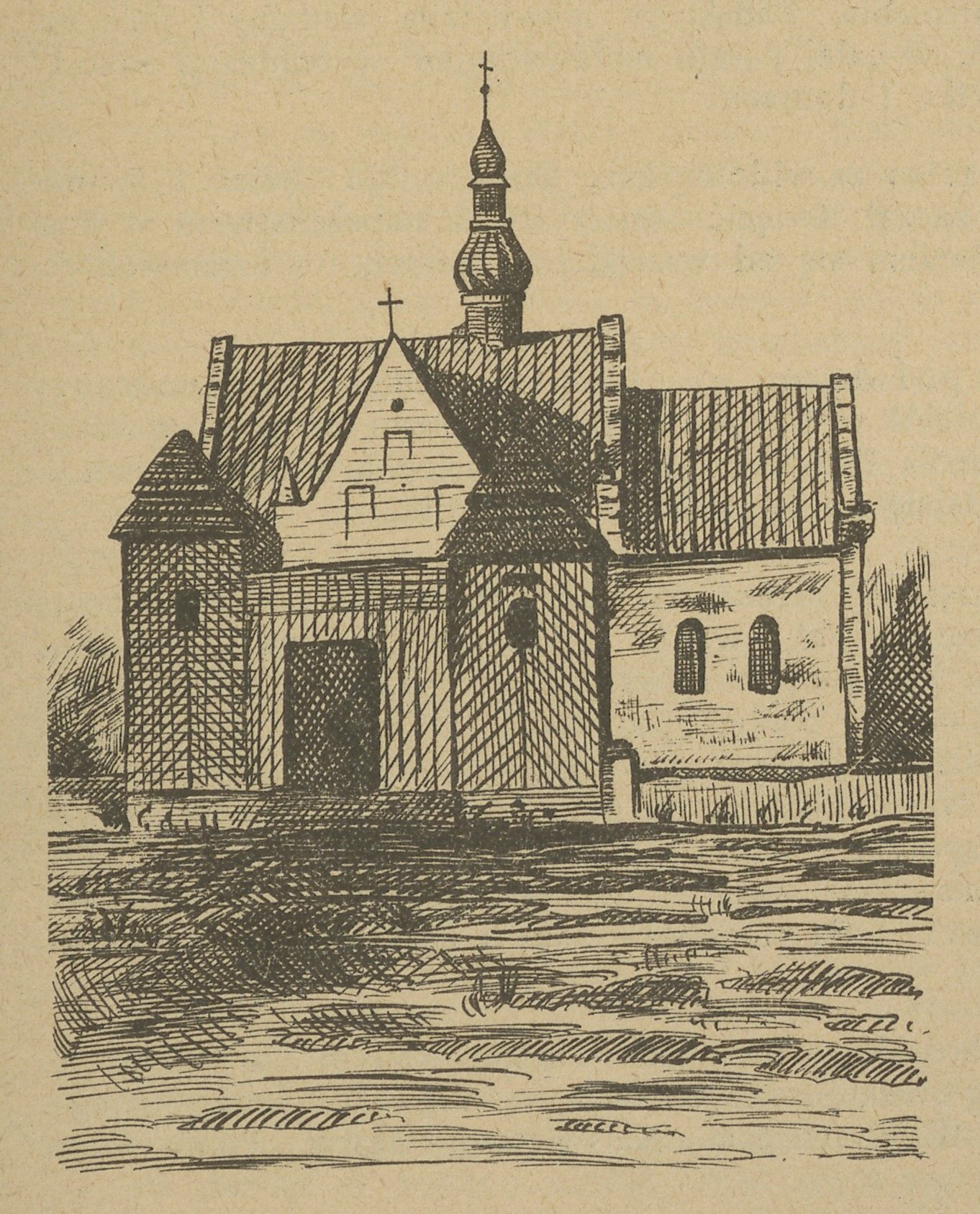
Saint Martin and Assumption of Mary church, before 1907
