= Połągiew =

- Village
- Location within Poland
- Coordinates: 51°1′15″N 21°14′11″E
- Country: Poland
- Voivodeship: Świętokrzyskie
- County: Starachowice
- Gmina: Brody
- Population: 260

Połągiew [pɔˈwɔŋɡʲɛf] is a village in the administrative district of Gmina Brody, within Starachowice County, Świętokrzyskie Voivodeship, in south-central Poland. It lies approximately 2 km (1 mi) south-east of Brody, 13 km (8 mi) east of Starachowice, and 47 km (29 mi) east of the regional capital Kielce.
