= Karwice =

Karwice may refer to the following places:

- Karwice, Łódź Voivodeship (central Poland)
- Karwice, Drawsko County in West Pomeranian Voivodeship (north-west Poland)
- Karwice, Sławno County in West Pomeranian Voivodeship (north-west Poland)
