= Ruda, Starachowice County =

Ruda
- Village
- Location within Poland
- Coordinates: 51°1′11″N 21°10′15″E
- Country: Poland
- Voivodeship: Świętokrzyskie
- County: Starachowice
- Gmina: Brody
- Population: 603

Ruda [ˈruda] is a village in the administrative district of Gmina Brody, within Starachowice County, Świętokrzyskie Voivodeship, in south-central Poland. It lies approximately 4 km (2 mi) west of Brody, 9 km (6 mi) south-east of Starachowice, and 42 km (26 mi) east of the regional capital Kielce.
