= Kuczów =

- Village
- Location within Poland
- Coordinates: 51°0′10″N 21°7′35″E
- Country: Poland
- Voivodeship: Świętokrzyskie
- County: Starachowice
- Gmina: Brody
- Population: 993

Kuczów [ˈkut͡ʂuf] is a village in the administrative district of Gmina Brody, within Starachowice County, Świętokrzyskie Voivodeship, in south-central Poland. It lies approximately 7 km (4 mi) west of Brody, 7 km (4 mi) south-east of Starachowice, and 39 km (24 mi) east of the regional capital Kielce.
