= Staw Kunowski =

- Village
- Location within Poland
- Coordinates: 51°0′5″N 21°15′14″E
- Country: Poland
- Voivodeship: Świętokrzyskie
- County: Starachowice
- Gmina: Brody
- Population: 368

Staw Kunowski [ˈstaf kuˈnɔfski] is a village in the administrative district of Gmina Brody, within Starachowice County, Świętokrzyskie Voivodeship, in south-central Poland. It lies approximately 4 km (2 mi) south-east of Brody, 15 km (9 mi) east of Starachowice, and 47 km (29 mi) east of the regional capital Kielce.
