= Antoni Julian Nowowiejski =

Polish Roman Catholic bishop and martyr

Blessed Antoni Julian Nowowiejski
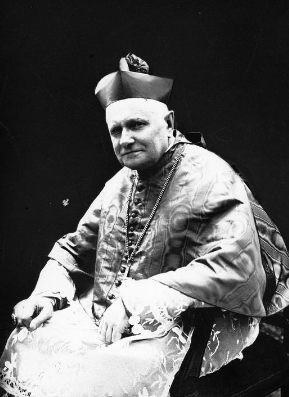
- Nowowiejski in 1921

Bishop of Płock
- Born: 11 February 1858; Lubienia, Poland
- Died: 28 May 1941 (aged 83); Działdowo, Poland
- Venerated in: Roman Catholic Church
- Beatified: 13 June 1999 by Pope John Paul II
- Feast: May 28

Antoni Julian Nowowiejski (11 February 1858 – 28 May 1941) was a Polish bishop of Płock (1908–1941), titular archbishop of Silyum, first secretary of Polish Episcopal Conference (1918–1919), honorary citizen of Płock and historian. He died at the hands of the Germans in Soldau concentration camp near Działdowo on 28 May 1941, and was subsequently beatified by Pope John Paul II in 1999 as one of the 108 Martyrs of World War II.

== Biography ==
Antoni Julian Nowowiejski was born on 11 February 1858 in Lubienia near Opatów. At sixteen he entered the diocesan seminary at studied Płock. He received Holy Orders on July 10, 1881. The following year he obtained a degree in theology from the Saint Petersburg Roman Catholic Theological Academy. Nowowiejski became a professor and a rector of the Płock Seminary, canon of Płock and in 1902 vicar general of the Płock diocese. He was ordained bishop of Płock on 6 December 1908.

As the leader of the Płock diocese he carried out an administrative reform, devoting much attention to catholic education and created a junior seminary. During the First World War, he was active in charity organizations. He oversaw two diocesans (synods) in 1927 and 1938, and initiated a local chapter of "Akcja Katolicka" (Catholic Action). In November 1930, he became the titular archbishop of Silyum.

In 1931, he was awarded the Commander's Cross with the Star of the Order of Rebirth of Poland by President Mościcki. The University of Warsaw awarded him the honorary title of doctor honoris causa.

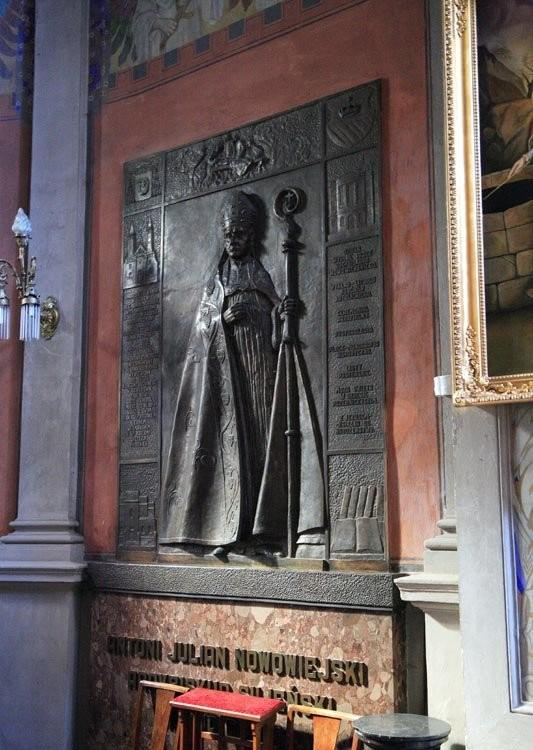
A tablet to beatified bishop Nowowiejski in Cathedral of Płock

On 1 September 1939, the German invasion of Poland marked the beginning of the Second World War. One of the Nazis' goals was the elimination of Polish intelligentsia. On 28 February 1940, Bishop Nowowiejski and Płock's suffragan bishop Leon Wetmański were arrested by the Germans and imprisoned in Słuck and Działdowo. He refused the chance to escape, saying, "How can a pastor abandon their sheep?" Archbishop Nowowiejski was tortured when he refused to trample on his pectoral cross. Although suffering, he imparted his blessing to the tortured and dying. After three months of torture and hunger, he died, at the age of eighty-three, at the Dzialdowo death camp on 28 May 1941. The place of burial of his body is unknown, but it is supposed that it was a forest in Malinowo.

He was beatified by Pope John Paul II on 13 June 1999 as one of the 108 Martyrs of World War II, and is commemorated on June 12.

== Works ==
Antoni Julian Nowowiejski was the author of many works in the realm of history (especially the history of Płock) and Catholic liturgy. His Cereminiał parafialny (Parish ceremony) became a standard textbook for parish priests, and went through seven editions before the war.

Selected works:

- Wykład liturgii Kościoła katolickiego
- Ceremoniał parafialny
- Płock. Monografia historyczna

Catholic Church titles
Preceded by Apolinary Wnukowski	Bishop of Płock; 1908-1941	Succeeded by Stanisław Figielski

== Sources ==
- (in Polish) BŁ. ABP ANTONI JULIAN NOWOWIEJSKI, retrieved on 25 September 2007
