= Styków, Świętokrzyskie Voivodeship =

Styków
- Village
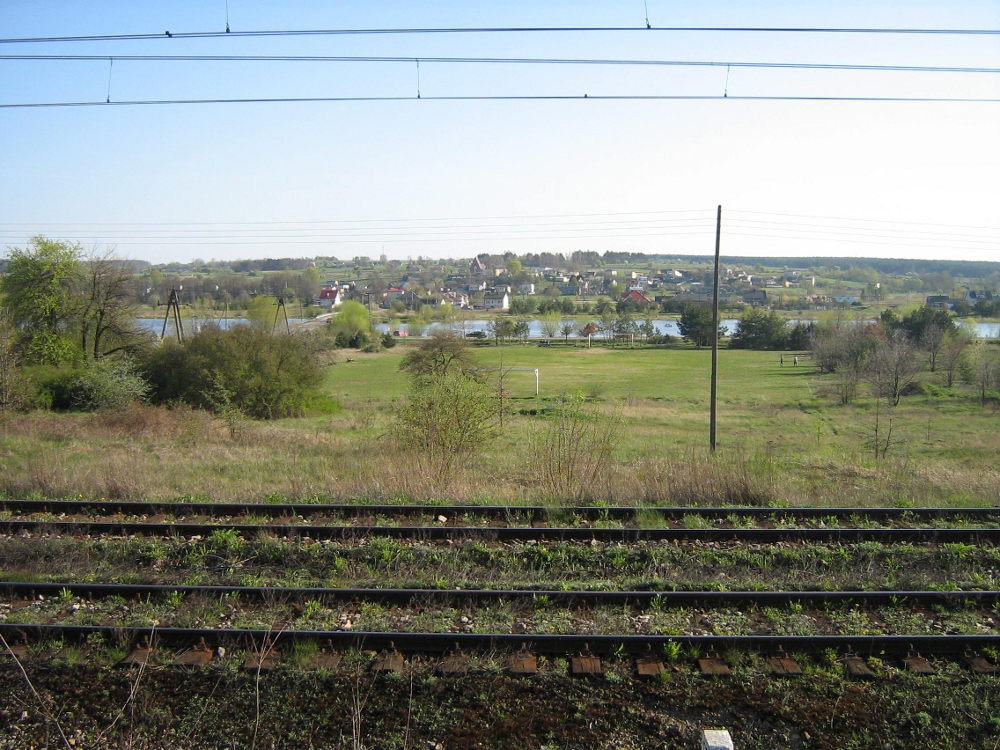

- Location within Poland
- Coordinates: 51°0′5″N 21°8′54″E
- Country: Poland
- Voivodeship: Świętokrzyskie
- County: Starachowice
- Gmina: Brody
- Population: 792

Styków [ˈstɨkuf] is a village in the administrative district of Gmina Brody, within Starachowice County, Świętokrzyskie Voivodeship, in south-central Poland. It lies approximately 6 km (4 mi) south-west of Brody, 8 km (5 mi) south-east of Starachowice, and 40 km (25 mi) east of the regional capital Kielce.
