= Ogonowice =

Ogonowice may refer to the following places in Poland:

- Ogonowice, Lower Silesian Voivodeship (south-west Poland)
- Ogonowice, Łódź Voivodeship (central Poland)
