= Brzustówek =

- Village
- Location within Poland
- Coordinates: 51°25′N 20°13′E
- Country: Poland
- Voivodeship: Łódź
- County: Opoczno
- Gmina: Opoczno

Brzustówek [bʐusˈtuvɛk] is a village in the administrative district of Gmina Opoczno, within Opoczno County, Łódź Voivodeship, in central Poland.
