= Kruszewiec-Kolonia =

- Village
- Location within Poland
- Coordinates: 51°26′52″N 20°17′03″E
- Country: Poland
- Voivodeship: Łódź
- County: Opoczno
- Gmina: Opoczno

Kruszewiec-Kolonia [kruˈʂɛvjɛt͡s kɔˈlɔɲa] is a village in the administrative district of Gmina Opoczno, within Opoczno County, Łódź Voivodeship, in central Poland.
