= Międzybórz, Łódź Voivodeship =

Międzybórz
- Village
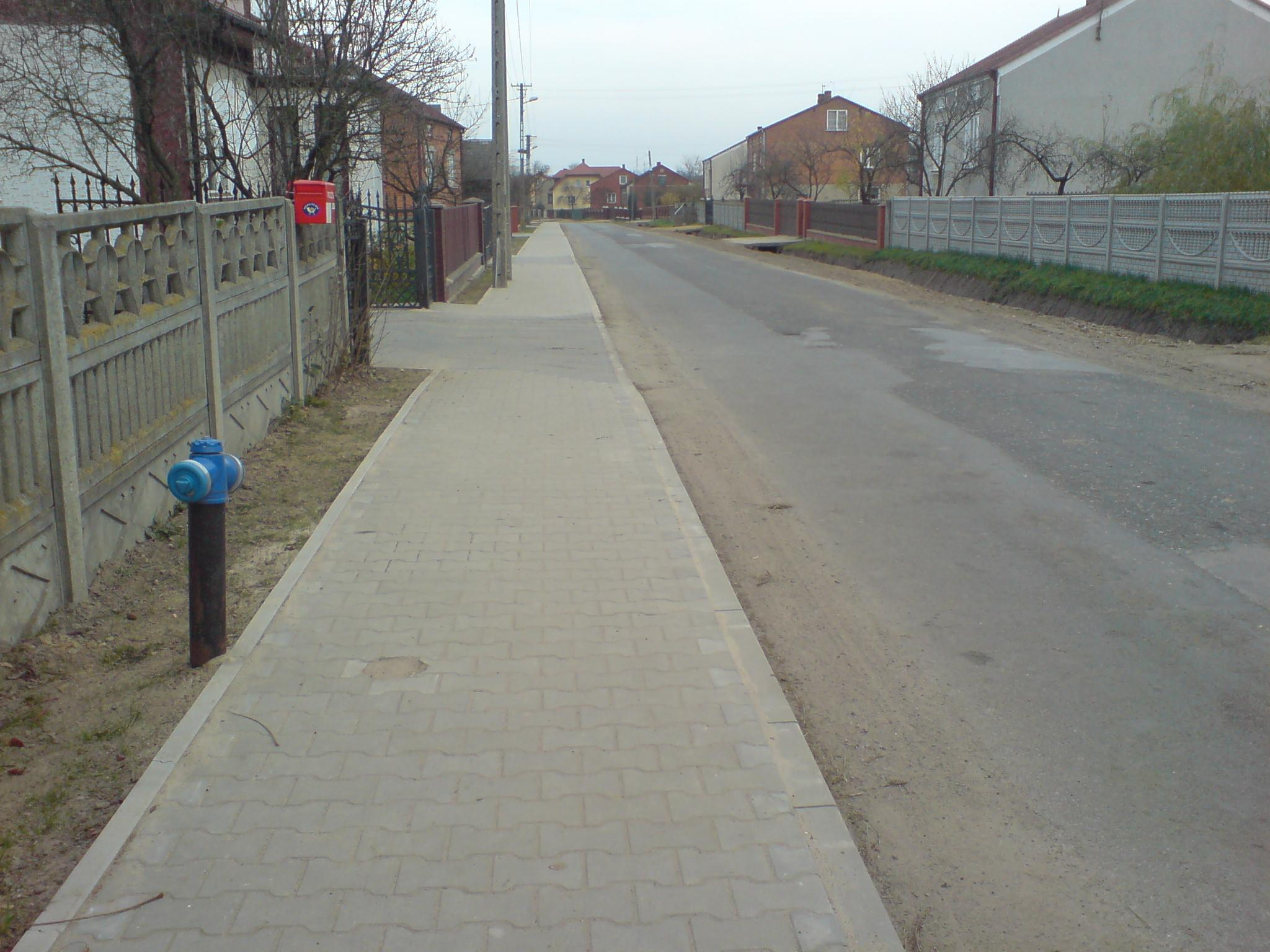

- Location within Poland
- Coordinates: 51°25′0″N 20°19′38″E
- Country: Poland
- Voivodeship: Łódź
- County: Opoczno
- Gmina: Opoczno
- Area: 2.57 km^{2} (0.99 sq mi)
- Population: 243
  - Density: 117/km^{2} (300/sq mi)

Międzybórz [mjɛnˈd͡zɨbuʂ] is a village in the administrative district of Gmina Opoczno, within Opoczno County, Łódź Voivodeship, in central Poland.

The village has an approximate population of 300.
