= Modrzew, Łódź Voivodeship =

Modrzew
- Village
- Location within Poland
- Coordinates: 51°26′N 20°13′E
- Country: Poland
- Voivodeship: Łódź
- County: Opoczno
- Gmina: Opoczno

Modrzew [ˈmɔdʐɛf](meaning Larch) is a village in the administrative district of Gmina Opoczno, within Opoczno County, Łódź Voivodeship, in central Poland.

== History ==
In the years 1975–1998, the town administratively belonged to the Piotrków Voivodeship .
