= Brzuśnia, Łódź Voivodeship =

Brzuśnia
- Village
- Location within Poland
- Coordinates: 51°27′N 20°29′E
- Country: Poland
- Voivodeship: Łódź
- County: Opoczno
- Gmina: Opoczno

Brzuśnia [ˈbʐuɕɲa] is a village in the administrative district of Gmina Opoczno, within Opoczno County, Łódź Voivodeship, in central Poland.
