= Wólka Karwicka =

- Village
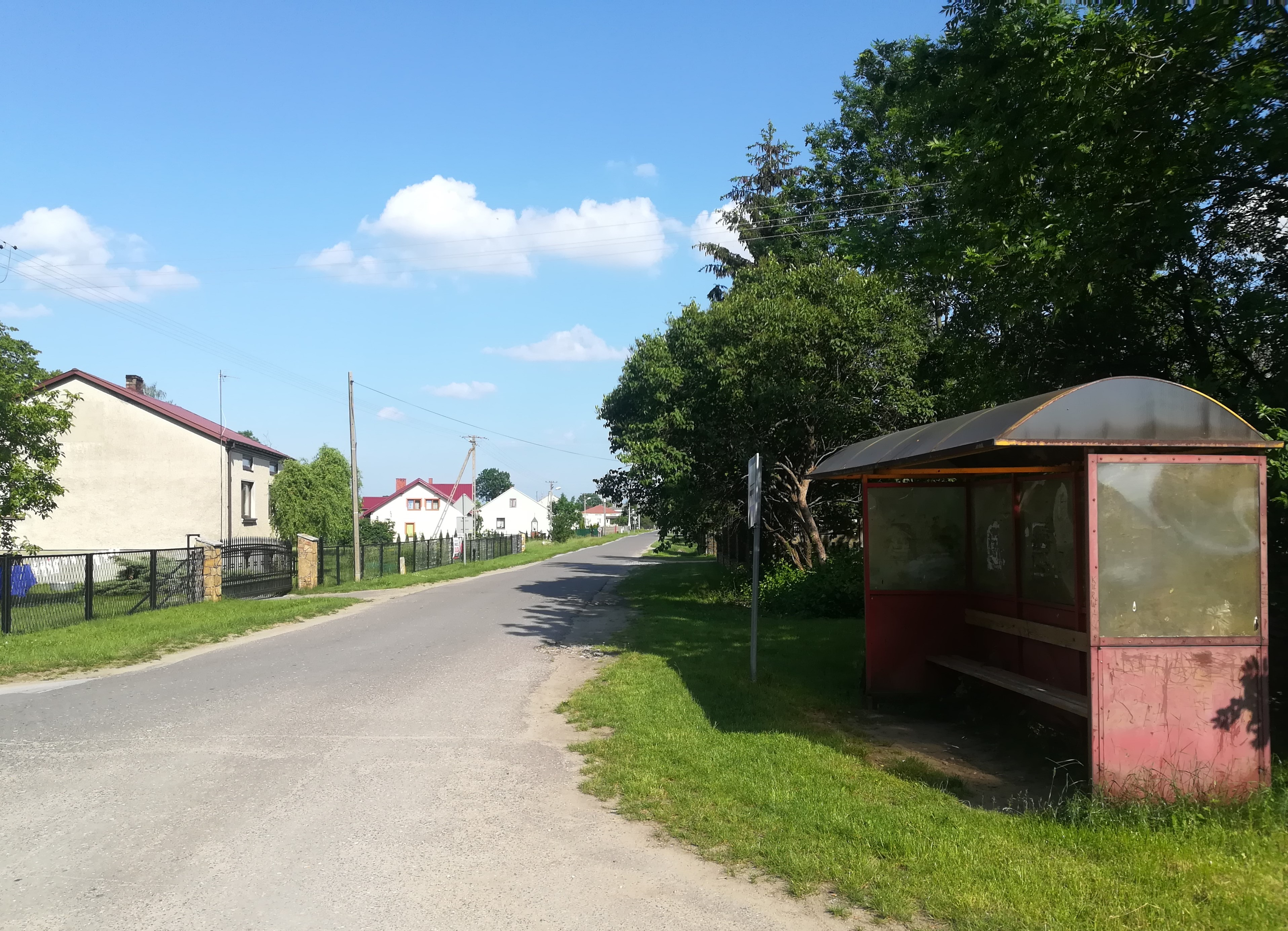

- Location within Poland
- Coordinates: 51°25′N 20°25′E
- Country: Poland
- Voivodeship: Łódź
- County: Opoczno
- Gmina: Opoczno

Wólka Karwicka [ˈvulka karˈvit͡ska] is a village in the administrative district of Gmina Opoczno, within Opoczno County, Łódź Voivodeship, in central Poland.
