= Wygnanów, Gmina Opoczno =

Wygnanów
- Village
- Location within Poland
- Coordinates: 51°24′21″N 20°22′32″E
- Country: Poland
- Voivodeship: Łódź
- County: Opoczno
- Gmina: Opoczno
- Population: 390

Wygnanów [vɨɡˈnanuf] is a village in the administrative district of Gmina Opoczno, within Opoczno County, Łódź Voivodeship, in central Poland.
