= Ostrów, Opoczno County =

Ostrów
- Village
- Location within Poland
- Coordinates: 51°20′27″N 20°17′12″E
- Country: Poland
- Voivodeship: Łódź
- County: Opoczno
- Gmina: Opoczno
- Population: 570

Ostrów [ˈɔstruf] is a village in the administrative district of Gmina Opoczno, within Opoczno County, Łódź Voivodeship, in central Poland.
