= Kruszewiec, Opoczno County =

Kruszewiec
- Village
- Location within Poland
- Coordinates: 51°26′N 20°18′E
- Country: Poland
- Voivodeship: Łódź
- County: Opoczno
- Gmina: Opoczno

Kruszewiec [kruˈʂɛvjɛt͡s] is a village in the administrative district of Gmina Opoczno, within Opoczno County, Łódź Voivodeship, in central Poland.
