= Sielec, Gmina Opoczno =

Sielec
- Village
- Location within Poland
- Coordinates: 51°20′45″N 20°23′35″E
- Country: Poland
- Voivodeship: Łódź
- County: Opoczno
- Gmina: Opoczno

Sielec [ˈɕɛlɛt͡s] is a village in the administrative district of Gmina Opoczno, within Opoczno County, Łódź Voivodeship, in central Poland.
