= Ziębów =

- Village
- Location within Poland
- Coordinates: 51°25′34″N 20°13′02″E
- Country: Poland
- Voivodeship: Łódź
- County: Opoczno
- Gmina: Opoczno

Ziębów [ˈʑɛmbuf] is a village in the administrative district of Gmina Opoczno, within Opoczno County, Łódź Voivodeship, in central Poland.
