= Antoniów, Gmina Opoczno =

Antoniów
- Village
- Location within Poland
- Coordinates: 51°28′5″N 20°12′30″E
- Country: Poland
- Voivodeship: Łódź
- County: Opoczno
- Gmina: Opoczno

Antoniów [anˈtɔɲuf] is a village in the administrative district of Gmina Opoczno, within Opoczno County, Łódź Voivodeship, in central Poland.
