= Stużno-Kolonia =

- Village
- Location within Poland
- Coordinates: 51°20′20″N 20°24′49″E
- Country: Poland
- Voivodeship: Łódź
- County: Opoczno
- Gmina: Opoczno

Stużno-Kolonia [ˈstuʐnɔ kɔˈlɔɲa] is a village in the administrative district of Gmina Opoczno, within Opoczno County, Łódź Voivodeship, in central Poland.
