= Kliny, Opoczno County =

Kliny
- Village
- Location within Poland
- Coordinates: 51°22′N 20°13′E
- Country: Poland
- Voivodeship: Łódź
- County: Opoczno
- Gmina: Opoczno

Kliny [ˈklinɨ] is a village in the administrative district of Gmina Opoczno, within Opoczno County, Łódź Voivodeship, in central Poland.
