= Kraśnica, Łódź Voivodeship =

Kraśnica
- Village
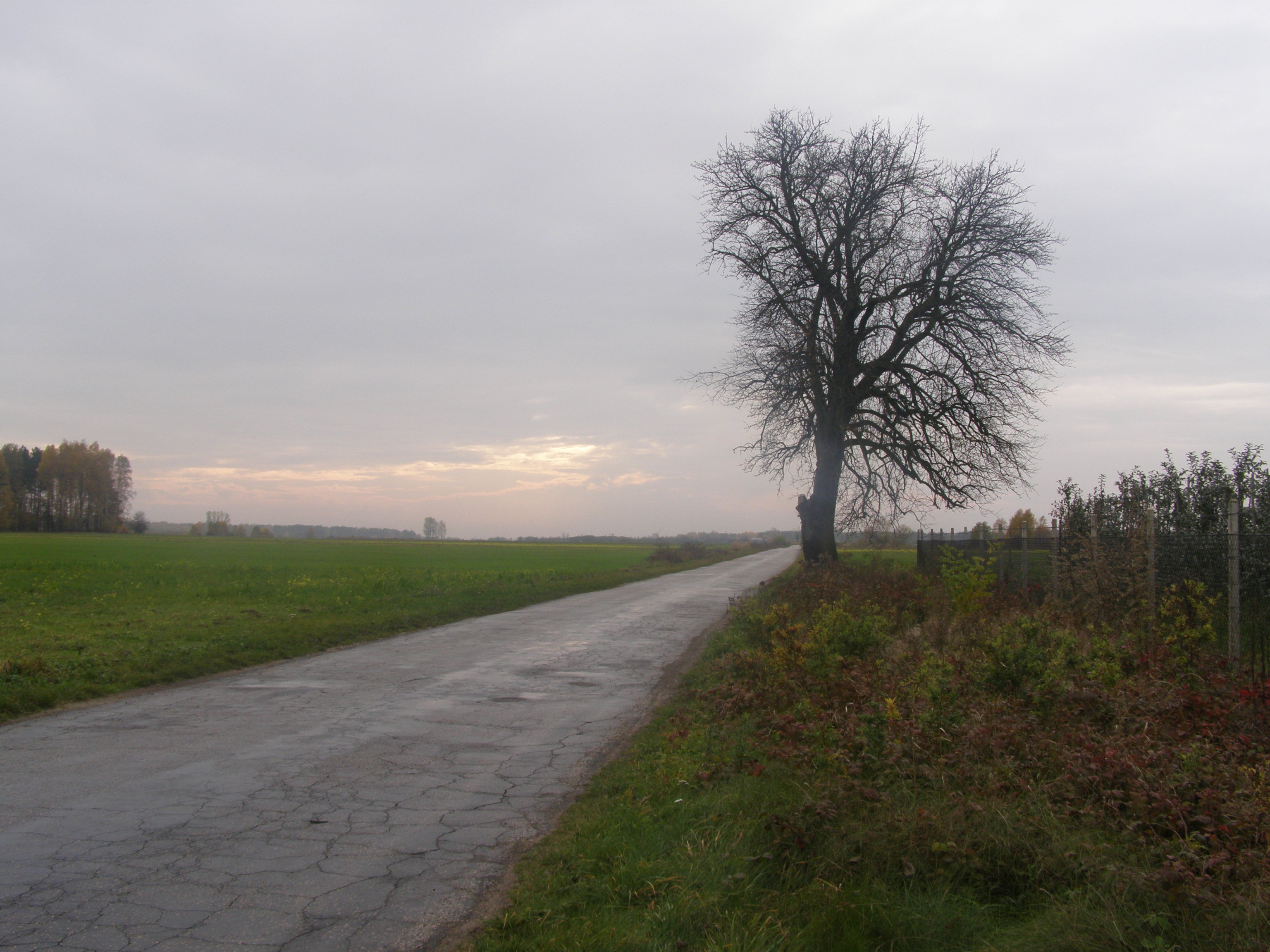

- Location within Poland
- Coordinates: 51°27′28″N 20°14′23″E
- Country: Poland
- Voivodeship: Łódź
- County: Opoczno
- Gmina: Opoczno

Kraśnica (Polish pronunciation: [kraɕˈnit͡sa]) is a village in the administrative district of Gmina Opoczno, within Opoczno County, Łódź Voivodeship, in central Poland.
