= Brzustówek-Kolonia =

- Village
- Location within Poland
- Coordinates: 51°25′9″N 20°13′48″E
- Country: Poland
- Voivodeship: Łódź
- County: Opoczno
- Gmina: Opoczno
- Number Zone: (+48) 44
- Vehicle registration: EOP

Brzustówek-Kolonia [bʐusˈtuvɛk kɔˈlɔɲa] is a village in the administrative district of Gmina Opoczno, within Opoczno County, Łódź Voivodeship, in central Poland.
