= Gmina Opoczno =

Gmina Opoczno Opoczno Commune
- Gmina
- Flag Coat of arms
- Interactive map of Gmina Opoczno
- Coordinates (Opoczno): 51°23′N 20°17′E
- Country: Poland
- Voivodeship: Łódź
- County: Opoczno
- Seat: Opoczno

Area
  - Total: 190.45 km^{2} (73.53 sq mi)

Population (2016)
  - Total: 21,635
  - Density: 113.60/km^{2} (294.22/sq mi)
  - Urban: 22,708
  - Rural: 12,710

Gmina Opoczno is an urban-rural gmina (administrative district) in Opoczno County, Łódź Voivodeship, in south-central Poland. Its seat is the town of Opoczno, which lies approximately 72 kilometres (45 mi) south-east of the regional capital Łódź.

The gmina covers an area of 190.45 square kilometres (73.5 sq mi), and as of 2016 its total population is 32,188 (out of which the population of Opoczno amounts to 22,708, and the population of the rural part of the gmina is 12,710).

The gmina contains part of the protected area called Spała Landscape Park.

== Villages ==
Apart from the town of Opoczno, Gmina Opoczno contains the villages and settlements of Adamów, Antoniów, Bielowice, Brzuśnia, Brzustówek, Brzustówek-Kolonia, Bukowiec Opoczyński, Dzielna, Janów Karwicki, Januszewice, Karwice, Kliny, Kraśnica, Kraszków, Kruszewiec, Kruszewiec PKP, Kruszewiec-Kolonia, Libiszów, Libiszów-Kolonia, Międzybórz, Modrzew, Modrzewek, Mroczków Gościnny, Ogonowice, Ostrów, Różanna, Sielec, Sitowa, Sobawiny, Stużno, Stużno-Kolonia, Wola Załężna, Wólka Karwicka, Wólka Karwicka-Kolonia, Wygnanów, Zameczek and Ziębów.

== Neighbouring gminas ==
Gmina Opoczno is bordered by the gminas of Białaczów, Drzewica, Gielniów, Gowarczów, Inowłódz, Poświętne and Sławno.
