= Mroczków Gościnny =

- Village
- Location within Poland
- Coordinates: 51°23′N 20°25′E
- Country: Poland
- Voivodeship: Łódź
- County: Opoczno
- Gmina: Opoczno
- Highest elevation: 240 m (790 ft)
- Lowest elevation: 220 m (720 ft)
- Population (approx.): 800

Mroczków Gościnny (Polish pronunciation: [ˈmrɔt͡ʂkuv ɡɔɕˈt͡ɕinnɨ]) is a village in the administrative district of Gmina Opoczno, within Opoczno County, Łódź Voivodeship, in central Poland.

The village has an approximate population of 800.
