= Wólka Karwicka-Kolonia =

- Village
- Location within Poland
- Coordinates: 51°24′31″N 20°23′34″E
- Country: Poland
- Voivodeship: Łódź
- County: Opoczno
- Gmina: Opoczno

Wólka Karwicka-Kolonia [ˈvulka karˈvit͡ska kɔˈlɔɲa] is a village in the administrative district of Gmina Opoczno, within Opoczno County, Łódź Voivodeship, in central Poland.
