= Śmiłów, Świętokrzyskie Voivodeship =

Śmiłów
- Village
- Location within Poland
- Coordinates: 50°50′9″N 21°41′20″E
- Country: Poland
- Voivodeship: Świętokrzyskie
- County: Opatów
- Gmina: Ożarów

Śmiłów [ˈɕmiwuf] is a village in the administrative district of Gmina Ożarów, within Opatów County, Świętokrzyskie Voivodeship, in south-central Poland. It lies approximately 7 km (4 mi) south of Ożarów, 19 km (12 mi) east of Opatów, and 76 km (47 mi) east of the regional capital Kielce.
