= Karwice, Łódź Voivodeship =

Karwice
- Village
- Location within Poland
- Coordinates: 51°21′35″N 20°22′13″E
- Country: Poland
- Voivodeship: Łódź
- County: Opoczno
- Gmina: Opoczno

Karwice [karˈvit͡sɛ] is a village in the administrative district of Gmina Opoczno, within Opoczno County, Łódź Voivodeship, in central Poland.
