= Gmina Brody, Świętokrzyskie Voivodeship =

Gmina Brody Brody Commune
- Gmina
- Coat of arms
- Interactive map of Gmina Brody
- Coordinates (Brody): 51°1′34″N 21°13′1″E
- Country: Poland
- Voivodeship: Świętokrzyskie
- County: Starachowice
- Seat: Brody

Area
  - Total: 161.25 km^{2} (62.26 sq mi)

Population (2006)
  - Total: 10,811
  - Density: 67.045/km^{2} (173.65/sq mi)
- Website: http://www.brody.info.pl

Gmina Brody is a rural gmina (administrative district) in Starachowice County, Świętokrzyskie Voivodeship, in south-central Poland. Its seat is the village of Brody, which lies approximately 11 kilometres (7 mi) east of Starachowice and 45 km (28 mi) east of the regional capital Kielce.

The gmina covers an area of 161.25 square kilometres (62.3 sq mi), and as of 2006 its total population is 10,811.

== Villages ==
Gmina Brody contains the villages and settlements of Adamów, Bór Kunowski, Brody, Budy Brodzkie, Dziurów, Henryk, Jabłonna, Krynki, Kuczów, Lipie, Lubienia, Młynek, Połągiew, Ruda, Rudnik, Staw Kunowski and Styków.

== Neighbouring gminas ==
Gmina Brody is bordered by the town of Starachowice and by the gminas of Iłża, Kunów, Mirzec, Pawłów, Rzeczniów, Sienno and Wąchock.
