= Jagodne, Świętokrzyskie Voivodeship =

Jagodne
- Village
- Location within Poland
- Coordinates: 51°8′45″N 20°58′28″E
- Country: Poland
- Voivodeship: Świętokrzyskie
- County: Starachowice
- Gmina: Mirzec
- Population: 720

Jagodne [jaˈɡɔdnɛ] is a village in the administrative district of Gmina Mirzec, within Starachowice County, Świętokrzyskie Voivodeship, in south-central Poland. It lies approximately 6 km (4 mi) north-east of Skarżysko-Kamienna and 39 km (24 mi) north-east of the regional capital Kielce.
