= Lubienia, Świętokrzyskie Voivodeship =

Lubienia
- Village
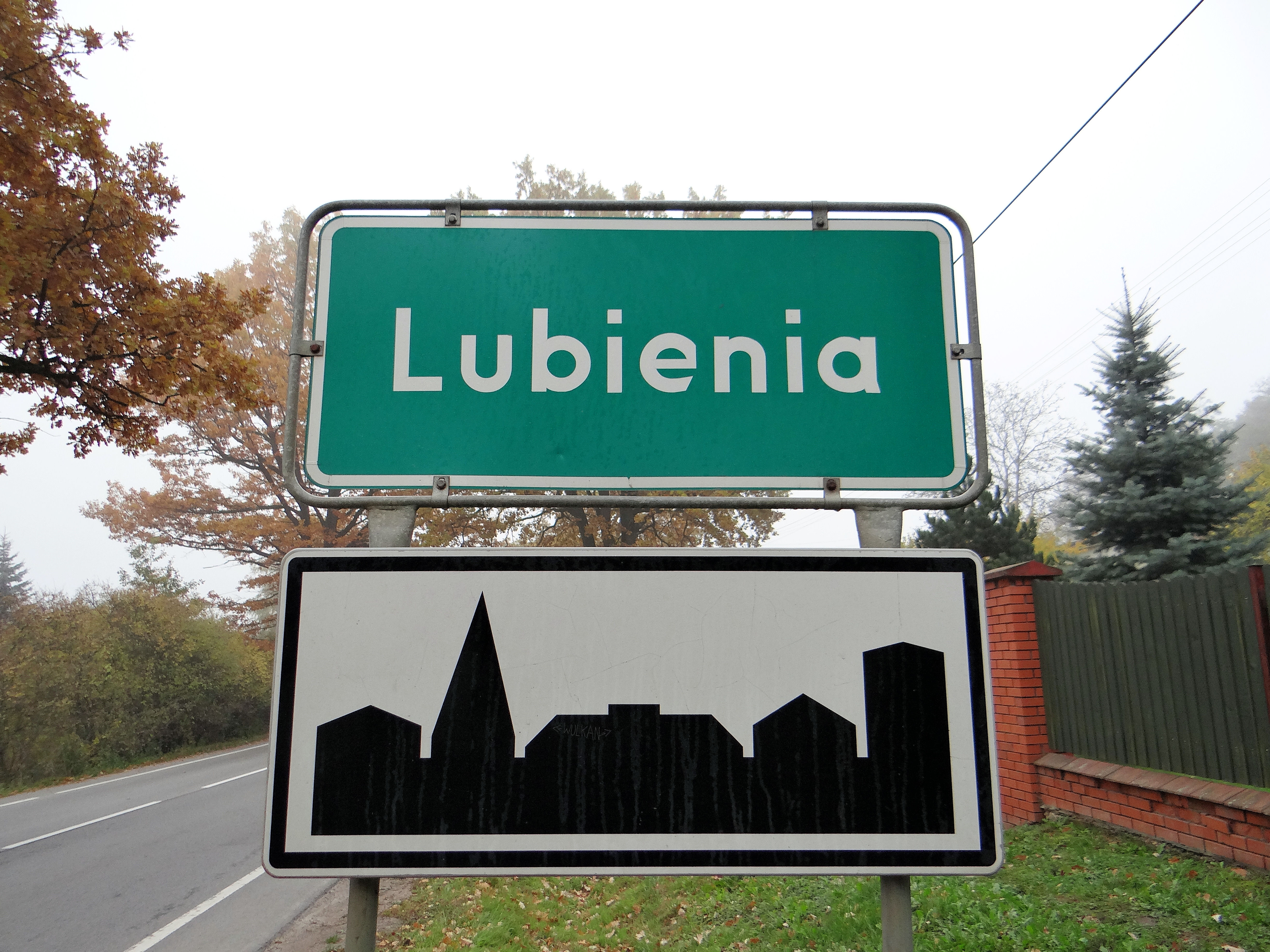

- Location within Poland
- Coordinates: 51°3′18″N 21°11′17″E
- Country: Poland
- Voivodeship: Świętokrzyskie
- County: Starachowice
- Gmina: Brody
- Population: 1,094

Lubienia [luˈbjɛɲa] is a village in the administrative district of Gmina Brody, within Starachowice County, Świętokrzyskie Voivodeship, in south-central Poland. It lies approximately 4 km (2 mi) north-west of Brody, 9 km (6 mi) east of Starachowice, and 45 km (28 mi) north-east of the regional capital Kielce.
