= Bielowice, Łódź Voivodeship =

Bielowice
- Village
- Location within Poland
- Coordinates: 51°24′N 20°23′E
- Country: Poland
- Voivodeship: Łódź
- County: Opoczno
- Gmina: Opoczno
- Population (approx.): 1,000

Bielowice [bjɛlɔˈvit͡sɛ] is a village in the administrative district of Gmina Opoczno, within Opoczno County, Łódź Voivodeship, in central Poland.

The village has an approximate population of 1,000.
