= Zameczek, Łódź Voivodeship =

Zameczek
- Village
- Location within Poland
- Coordinates: 51°24′43″N 20°21′34″E
- Country: Poland
- Voivodeship: Łódź
- County: Opoczno
- Gmina: Opoczno
- Population: 90

Zameczek [zaˈmɛt͡ʂɛk] is a village in the administrative district of Gmina Opoczno, within Opoczno County, Łódź Voivodeship, in central Poland.
