= Różanna, Łódź Voivodeship =

Różanna
- Village
- Location within Poland
- Coordinates: 51°23′N 20°20′E
- Country: Poland
- Voivodeship: Łódź
- County: Opoczno
- Gmina: Opoczno

Różanna [ruˈʐanna] is a village in the administrative district of Gmina Opoczno, within Opoczno County, Łódź Voivodeship, in central Poland.
