= Libiszów-Kolonia =

Village in Gmina Opoczno, Poland

- Village
- Location within Poland
- Coordinates: 51°25′57″N 20°17′45″E
- Country: Poland
- Voivodeship: Łódź
- County: Opoczno
- Gmina: Opoczno

Libiszów-Kolonia [liˈbiʂuf kɔˈlɔɲa] is a village in the administrative district of Gmina Opoczno, within Opoczno County, Łódź Voivodeship, in central Poland.
