= Libiszów, Łódź Voivodeship =

Libiszów
- Village
- Location within Poland
- Coordinates: 51°26′N 20°20′E
- Country: Poland
- Voivodeship: Łódź
- County: Opoczno
- Gmina: Opoczno
- Population: 350

Libiszów [liˈbiʂuf] is a village in the administrative district of Gmina Opoczno, within Opoczno County, Łódź Voivodeship, in central Poland.
