= Brody, Starachowice County =

Brody
- Village
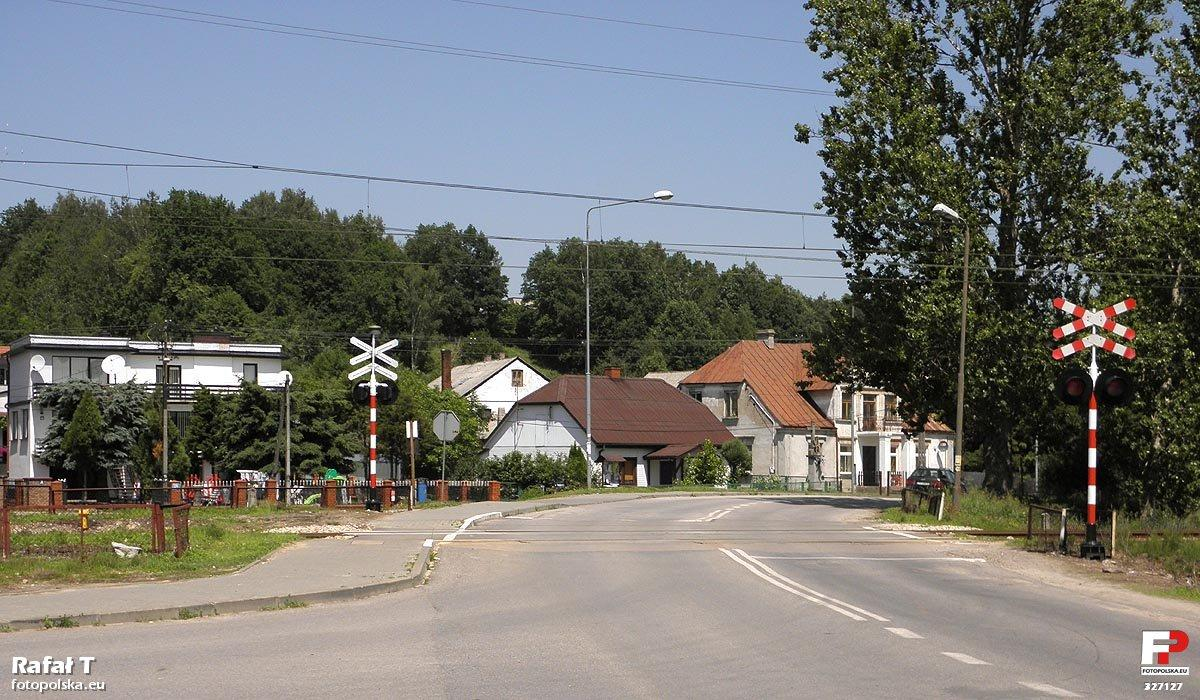

- Coat of arms

- Location within Poland
- Coordinates: 51°1′34″N 21°13′1″E
- Country: Poland
- Voivodeship: Świętokrzyskie
- County: Starachowice
- Gmina: Brody
- Population: 1,737

Brody [ˈbrɔdɨ] is a village in Starachowice County, Świętokrzyskie Voivodeship, in south-central Poland. It is the seat of the gmina (administrative district) called Gmina Brody. It lies approximately 11 km (7 mi) east of Starachowice and 45 km (28 mi) east of the regional capital Kielce.

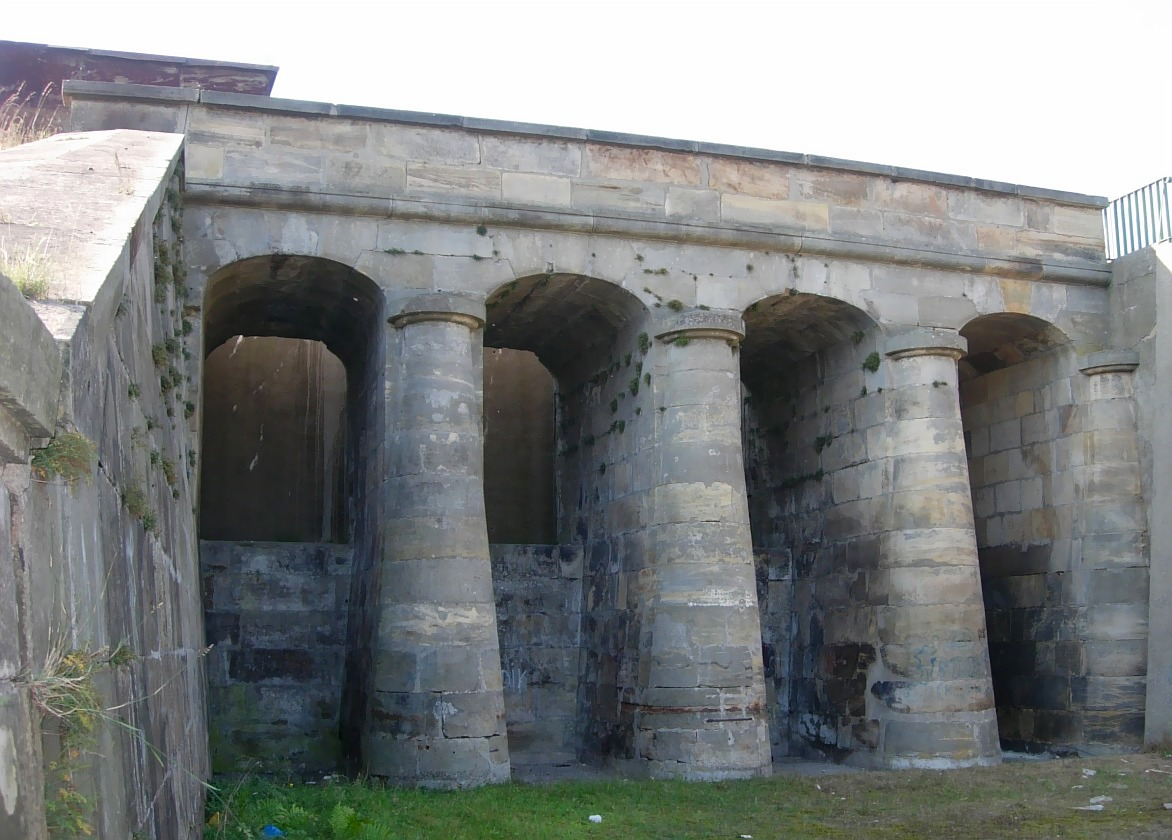
Old dam in Brody
