= Łysiec =

Łysiec may refer to the following places in Poland:

- Łysiec or Łysa Góra, a mountain in central Poland
- Łysiec, Silesian Voivodeship, a village in south Poland
- Łysiec, Polish name for Lysets, a village in western Ukraine

== See also ==
- Łysica
