= Oziębłów =

- Village
- Location within Poland
- Coordinates: 50°47′15″N 21°19′39″E
- Country: Poland
- Voivodeship: Świętokrzyskie
- County: Opatów
- Gmina: Baćkowice
- Population: 210

Oziębłów [ɔˈʑɛmbwuf] is a village in the administrative district of Gmina Baćkowice, within Opatów County, Świętokrzyskie Voivodeship, in south-central Poland. It lies approximately 7 km (4 mi) east of Baćkowice, 8 km (5 mi) west of Opatów, and 52 km (32 mi) east of the regional capital Kielce.
