= Jarosław Rusiecki =

Polish politician (born 1961)

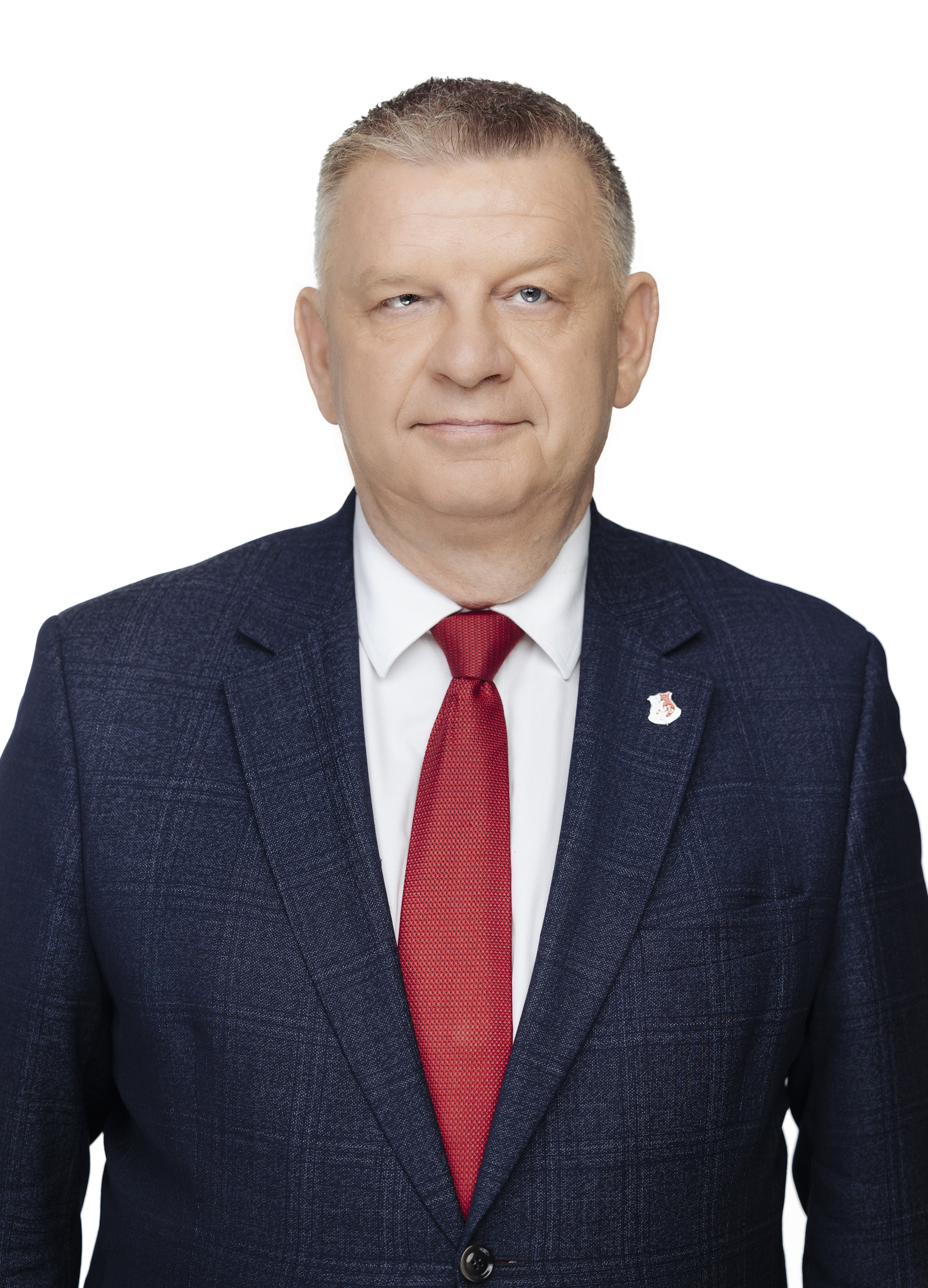

Member of the Sejm
- Incumbent
- Assumed office 25 September 2005
- Constituency: 33 – Kielce

Personal details
- Born: 20 July 1961 (age 64)
- Party: Law and Justice

Jarosław Rusiecki (born 20 July 1961 in Stary Nieskurzów) is a Polish politician. He was elected to the Sejm on 25 September 2005, getting 4009 votes in 33 Kielce district as a candidate from the Law and Justice list.

== See also ==
- Members of Polish Sejm 2005-2007
