= Lesser Poland Upland =

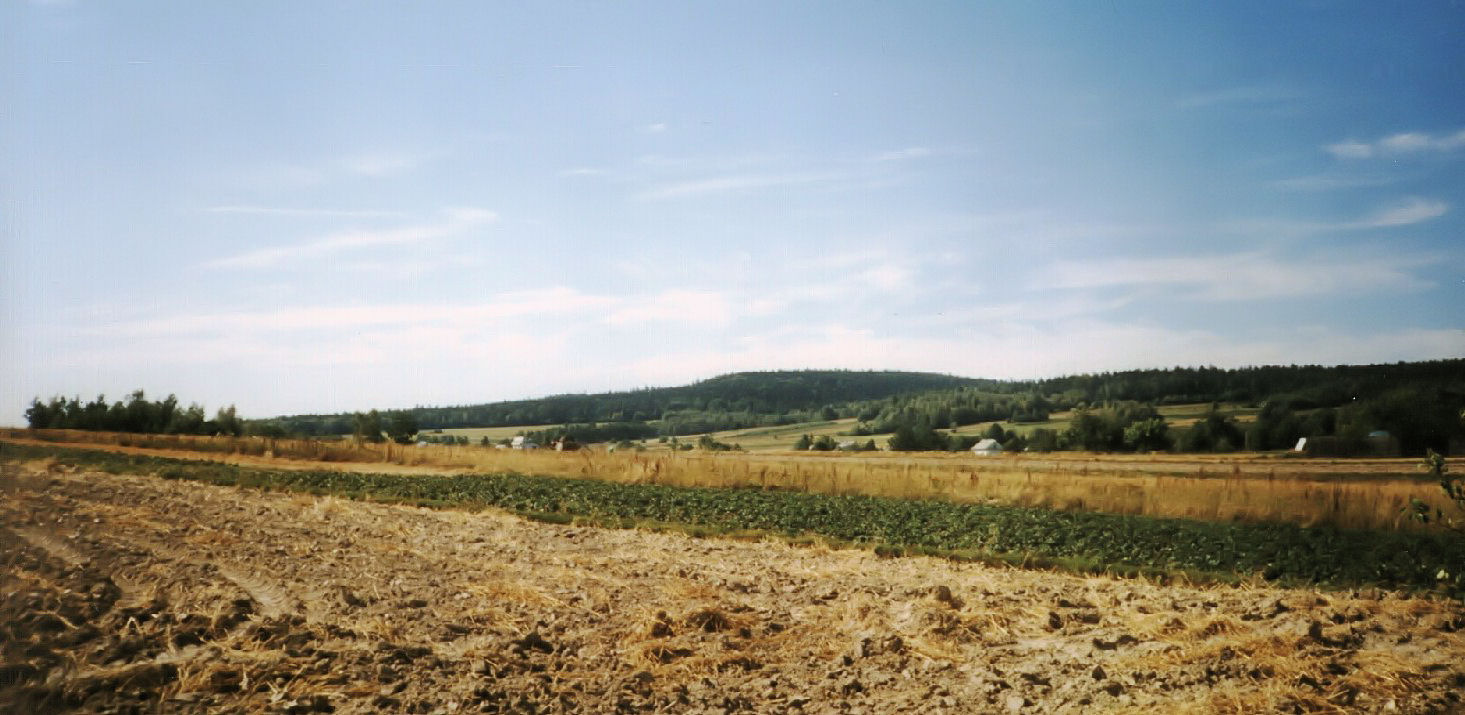

Lesser Poland Upland (Polish: Wyżyna Małopolska) is an upland located in southern part of Poland, in the historic region of Lesser Poland. It extends from the valley of the upper Vistula, between Kraków and Sandomierz, to Opoczno and Radomsko in the northwest. Average height is between 200 and 400 meters above sea level, with the highest peak being the Łysica in the Holy Cross Mountains (612 meters above sea level). Major cities of the region are Kielce, Ostrowiec Świętokrzyski and, Skarżysko-Kamienna.

Lesser Poland Upland is divided into the following subregions:

- Przedbórz Upland (Wyzyna Przedborska), which lies in the northwestern corner of Lesser Poland Upland, in three voivodeships - Łódź Voivodeship, Silesian Voivodeship, and Świętokrzyskie Voivodeship. Przedborz Upland has the area of 5,300 km^{2}., stretching along the Upper Pilica river. Its highest hill (351 meters above sea level) lies near the village of Ciesle. Przedborz Upland itself is divided into six smaller subregions: Radomsko Hills, Opoczno Hills, Lelów Range, Włoszczowa Basin, Przedborz - Małogoszcz Range, and Lopuszno Hills. Main towns located in Przedborz Upland are Radomsko, Opoczno, Przedbórz, Małogoszcz, Końskie and Włoszczowa.
- Nida Basin (Niecka Nidzianska), also called Miechów Basin, which lies between Świętokrzyskie Voivodeship and Lesser Poland Voivodeship. It is a lowland, located between Polish Jura and Kielce Upland. Its highest point is Biala Gora (White Mountain), 416 meters above sea level. Nida Basin is sparsely populated, with the largest urban centers of Busko-Zdrój, Jędrzejów and Pińczów. It is divided into the following subregions: Jedrzejow Plateau, Proszowice Plateau, Wodzisław Hills, Nida Valley, Solec Zdroj Plain, Pińczów Hills, Polaniec Plain, and MiechówUpland.
- Kielce Upland (Wyzyna Kielecka), also called Kielce - Sandomierz Upland. It lies in Mazovian Voivodeship, Lodz Voivodeship, and Świętokrzyskie Voivodeship stretching from the area of Opoczno in the northwest to Sandomierz in the southeast, and includes Świętokrzyskie Mountains, with its highest peak, Lysica (612 meters above sea level). Kielce Upland is divided into the following subregions: Suchedniów Plateau, Gielniów Hills, Iłża Foothills, Świętokrzyskie Mountains, Sandomierz Upland, and Szydłów Foothills.
