= Janczyce =

- Village
- Location within Poland
- Coordinates: 50°45′50″N 21°13′59″E
- Country: Poland
- Voivodeship: Świętokrzyskie
- County: Opatów
- Gmina: Baćkowice
- Population (2020): 147

Janczyce [janˈt͡ʂɨt͡sɛ] is a village in the administrative district of Gmina Baćkowice, within Opatów County, Świętokrzyskie Voivodeship, in south-central Poland. It lies approximately 4 km (2 mi) south of Baćkowice, 15 km (9 mi) west of Opatów, and 46 km (29 mi) east of the regional capital Kielce.
