= Nowy Nieskurzów =

- Village
- Location within Poland
- Coordinates: 50°47′22″N 21°12′16″E
- Country: Poland
- Voivodeship: Świętokrzyskie
- County: Opatów
- Gmina: Baćkowice
- Population: 410

Nowy Nieskurzów [ˈnɔvɨ ɲɛsˈkuʐuf] is a village in the administrative district of Gmina Baćkowice, within Opatów County, Świętokrzyskie Voivodeship, in south-central Poland. It lies approximately 3 km (2 mi) west of Baćkowice, 16 km (10 mi) west of Opatów, and 43 km (27 mi) east of the regional capital Kielce.
