= Wszachów =

- Village
- Location within Poland
- Coordinates: 50°45′41″N 21°10′1″E
- Country: Poland
- Voivodeship: Świętokrzyskie
- County: Opatów
- Gmina: Baćkowice
- Population: 780

Wszachów [ˈfʂaxuf] is a village in the administrative district of Gmina Baćkowice, within Opatów County, Świętokrzyskie Voivodeship, in south-central Poland. It lies approximately 6 km (4 mi) south-west of Baćkowice, 19 km (12 mi) west of Opatów, and 41 km (25 mi) east of the regional capital Kielce.
