= Modliborzyce, Świętokrzyskie Voivodeship =

Modliborzyce
- Village
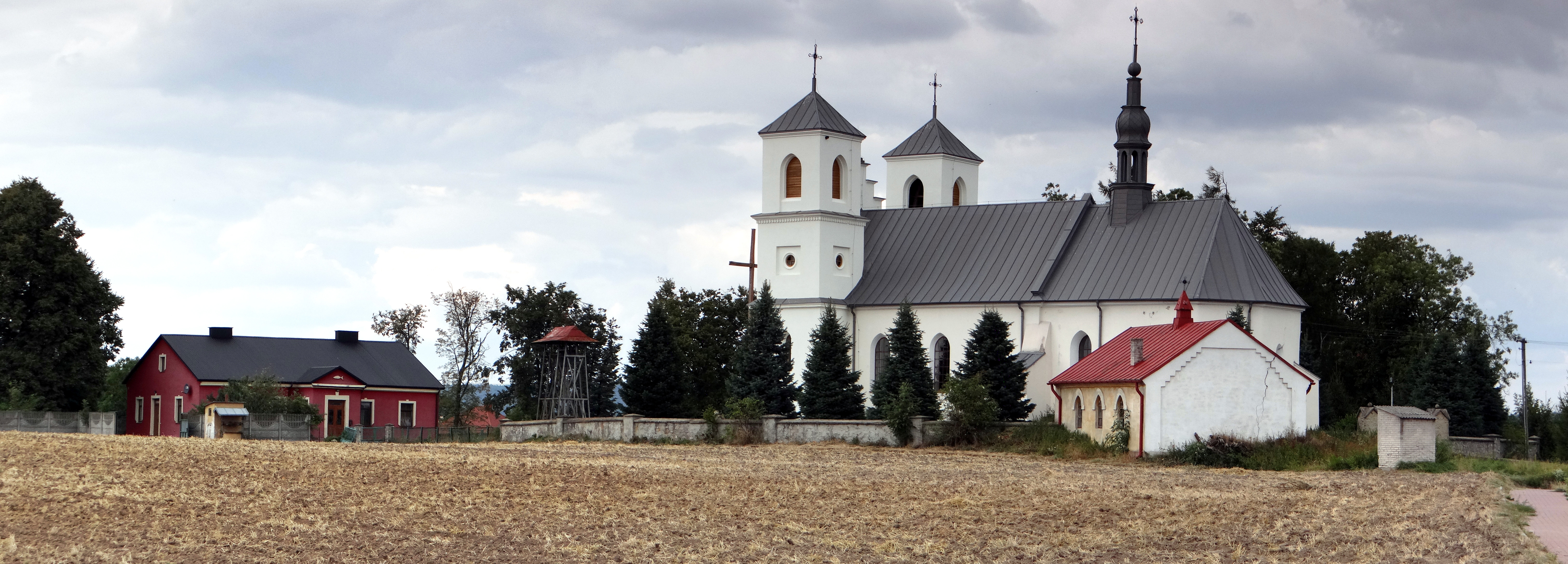
- Church of Saint Benedict

- Location within Poland
- Coordinates: 50°46′37″N 21°17′35″E
- Country: Poland
- Voivodeship: Świętokrzyskie
- County: Opatów
- Gmina: Baćkowice

Population
  - Total: 430

Modliborzyce [mɔdlibɔˈʐɨt͡sɛ] is a village in the administrative district of Gmina Baćkowice, within Opatów County, Świętokrzyskie Voivodeship, in south-central Poland. It lies approximately 5 km (3 mi) south-east of Baćkowice, 10 km (6 mi) west of Opatów, and 50 km (31 mi) east of the regional capital Kielce.
