= Żerniki, Opatów County =

Żerniki
- Village
- Location within Poland
- Coordinates: 50°47′11″N 21°16′1″E
- Country: Poland
- Voivodeship: Świętokrzyskie
- County: Opatów
- Gmina: Baćkowice
- Population: 240

Żerniki (Polish pronunciation: [ʐɛrˈɲikʲi]) is a village in the administrative district of Gmina Baćkowice, within Opatów County, Świętokrzyskie Voivodeship, in south-central Poland. It lies approximately 3 km (2 mi) south-east of Baćkowice, 12 km (7 mi) west of Opatów, and 47 km (29 mi) east of the regional capital Kielce.
