= Olszownica =

- Village
- Location within Poland
- Coordinates: 50°48′10″N 21°14′44″E
- Country: Poland
- Voivodeship: Świętokrzyskie
- County: Opatów
- Gmina: Baćkowice
- Population: 440

Olszownica [ɔlʂɔvˈnit͡sa] is a village in the administrative district of Gmina Baćkowice, within Opatów County, Świętokrzyskie Voivodeship, in south-central Poland. It lies approximately 2 km (1 mi) north-east of Baćkowice, 13 km (8 mi) west of Opatów, and 46 km (29 mi) east of the regional capital Kielce.
