= Piskrzyn =

- Village
- Location within Poland
- Coordinates: 50°46′15″N 21°16′25″E
- Country: Poland
- Voivodeship: Świętokrzyskie
- County: Opatów
- Gmina: Baćkowice
- Population: 220

Piskrzyn [ˈpiskʂɨn] is a village in the administrative district of Gmina Baćkowice, within Opatów County, Świętokrzyskie Voivodeship, in south-central Poland. It lies approximately 5 km (3 mi) south-east of Baćkowice, 12 km (7 mi) west of Opatów, and 48 km (30 mi) east of the regional capital Kielce.
