= Baranówek =

Baranówek refers to the following places in Poland:

- Baranówek, Greater Poland Voivodeship
- Baranówek, Świętokrzyskie Voivodeship
