= Rudniki, Opatów County =

Rudniki
- Village
- Location within Poland
- Coordinates: 50°46′12″N 21°18′47″E
- Country: Poland
- Voivodeship: Świętokrzyskie
- County: Opatów
- Gmina: Baćkowice
- Population: 220

Rudniki [rudˈniki] is a village in the administrative district of Gmina Baćkowice, within Opatów County, Świętokrzyskie Voivodeship, in south-central Poland. It lies approximately 7 km (4 mi) south-east of Baćkowice, 9 km (6 mi) south-west of Opatów, and 51 km (32 mi) east of the regional capital Kielce.
