= Rodnover Confederation =

- Konfederacja Rodzimowiercza
- Formation: August 23, 2015; 11 years ago
- Founded at: Łysogóry
- Type: Rodnovery
- Location: Poland

The Rodnover Confederation (Konfederacja Rodzimowiercza) is a confederation of Polish Rodnover neopagan organisations, founded on 23 August 2015 during the 3rd All-Poland Rodnover Congress in Łysogóry.

In May 2016 on behalf of the Rodnover Confederation the first celebration of the Stado festival in 500 years was organised.
