= Piórków-Kolonia =

- Village
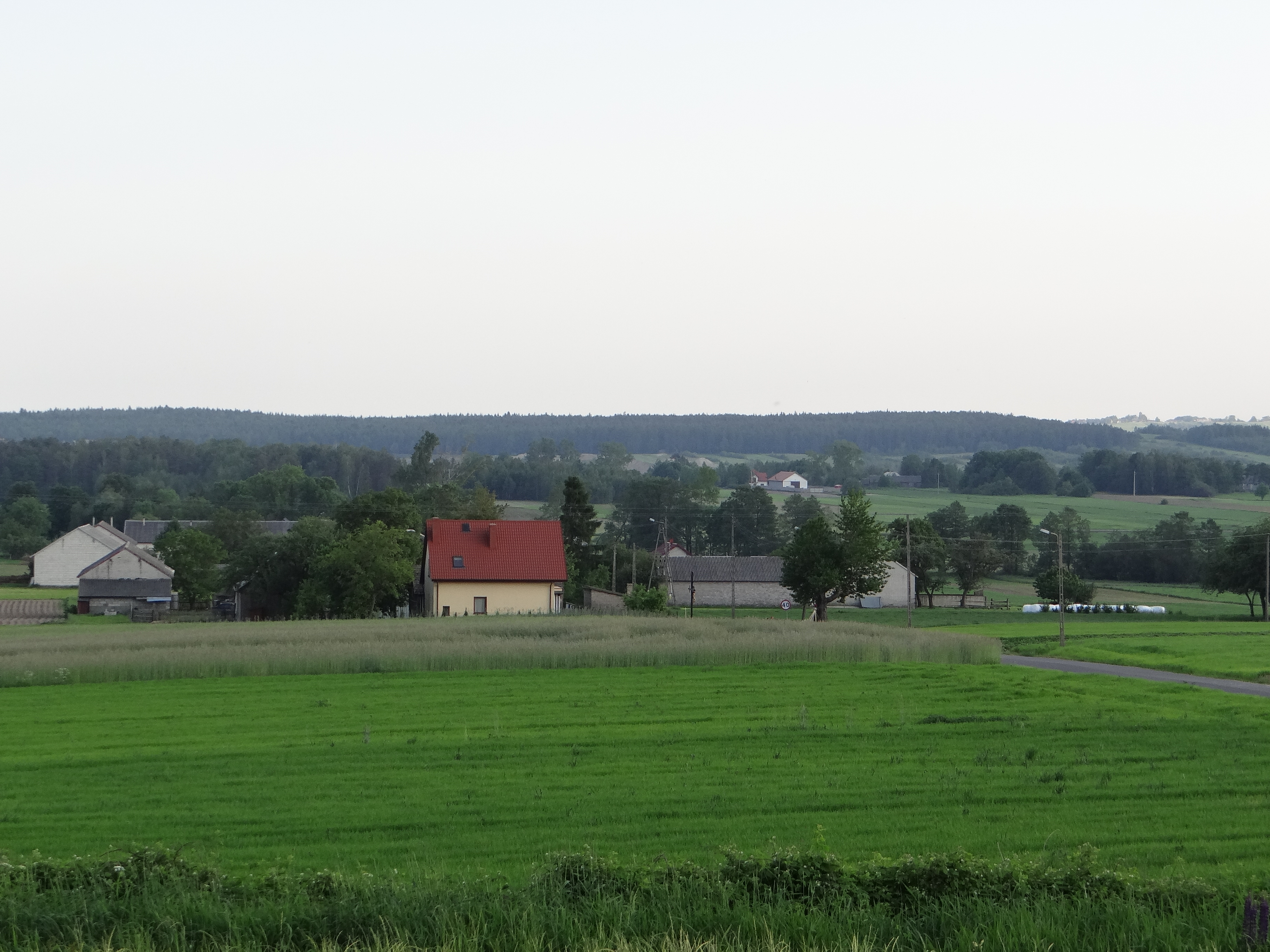

- Location within Poland
- Coordinates: 50°47′22″N 21°9′2″E
- Country: Poland
- Voivodeship: Świętokrzyskie
- County: Opatów
- Gmina: Baćkowice
- Population: 420

Piórków-Kolonia [ˈpjurkuf kɔˈlɔɲa] is a village in the administrative district of Gmina Baćkowice, within Opatów County, Świętokrzyskie Voivodeship, in south-central Poland. It lies approximately 6 km (4 mi) west of Baćkowice, 20 km (12 mi) west of Opatów, and 39 km (24 mi) east of the regional capital Kielce.
