= Piórków =

- Village
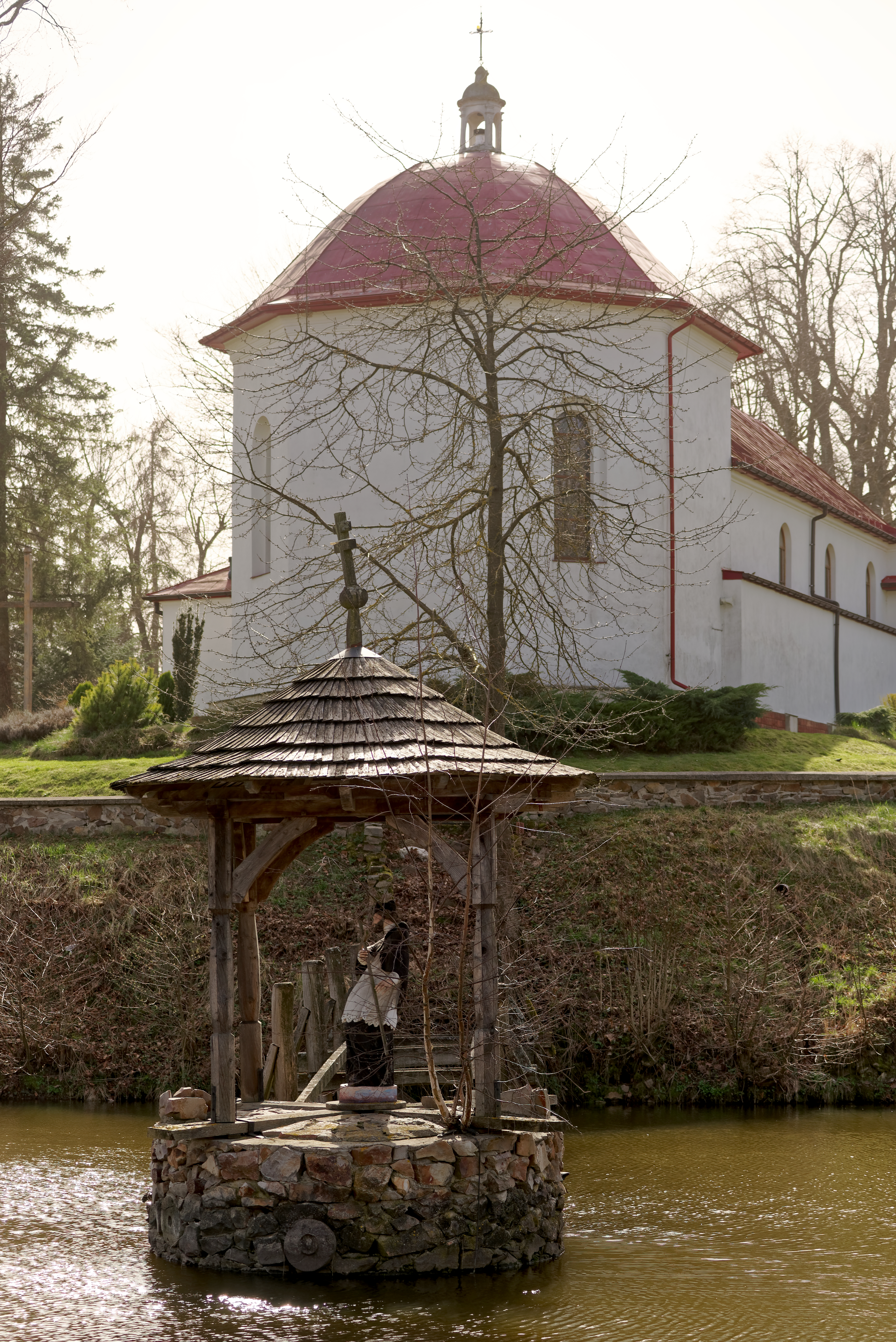
- Catholic church

- Location within Poland
- Coordinates: 50°47′55″N 21°9′20″E
- Country: Poland
- Voivodeship: Świętokrzyskie
- County: Opatów
- Gmina: Baćkowice
- Population: 480

Piórków [ˈpjurkuf] is a village in the administrative district of Gmina Baćkowice, within Opatów County, Świętokrzyskie Voivodeship, in south-central Poland. It lies approximately 6 km (4 mi) west of Baćkowice, 19 km (12 mi) west of Opatów, and 40 km (25 mi) east of the regional capital Kielce.
