= Łysogóry =

Mountain range in central Poland

Coordinates: 50°53′N 20°57′E

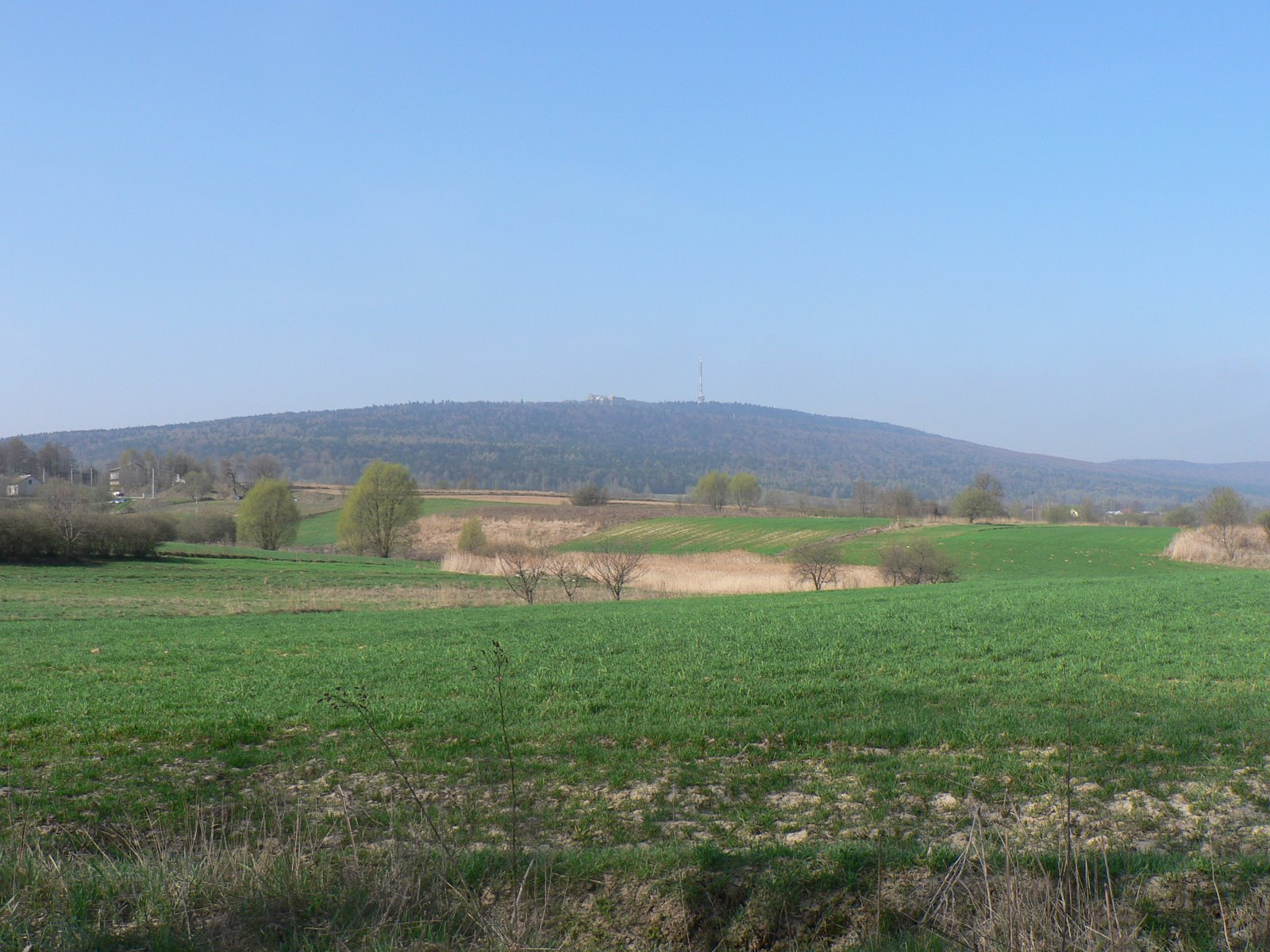
Mount Łysa Góra of the Łysogóry Range, seen from the east

Łysogóry is the largest mountain range in the Świętokrzyskie Mountains of central Poland. It is 25 km long, and runs from the Lubrzanka river in the northwest to the area of Nowa Słupia in the southeast. It contains the highest peak of the Świetokrzyskie Mountains (Łysica) and its mountain (Łysa Góra).
