= Baranówek, Świętokrzyskie Voivodeship =

Baranówek
- Village
- Location within Poland
- Coordinates: 50°46′25″N 21°15′2″E
- Country: Poland
- Voivodeship: Świętokrzyskie
- County: Opatów
- Gmina: Baćkowice
- Population: 210

Baranówek [baraˈnuvɛk] is a village in the administrative district of Gmina Baćkowice, within Opatów County, Świętokrzyskie Voivodeship, in south-central Poland. It lies approximately 3 km (2 mi) south-east of Baćkowice, 13 km (8 mi) west of Opatów, and 47 km (29 mi) east of the regional capital Kielce.
