= Lysa Hora =

Lysa Hora or Łysa Góra (literally "Bald Mountain" meaning barren mountain, featureless mountain in Slavic languages) and similar may mean:

== Lysa Hora ==
- Lysa Hora (Kyiv), a large woody hill in Kyiv
- Lysá hora, a mountain in the Czech Republic
- Lysa Hora (folklore), a mountain related to witchcraft in Slavic folk mythology

== Łysa Góra ==
- Łysa Góra, one of the Świętokrzyskie mountains in central Poland.
- Łysa Góra, Lesser Poland Voivodeship (south Poland)
- Łysa Góra, part of the Swoszowice district of Kraków
- Łysa Góra, Łódź Voivodeship (central Poland)
- Łysa Góra, Hrubieszów County in Lublin Voivodeship (east Poland)
- Łysa Góra, Puławy County in Lublin Voivodeship (east Poland)
- Łysa Góra, Subcarpathian Voivodeship (south-east Poland)
- Łysa Góra, Warmian-Masurian Voivodeship (north Poland)
- Łysa Góra, West Pomeranian Voivodeship (north-west Poland)
