= Bald Mountain (folklore) =

Witchcraft location in Slavic mythology

Bald Mountain, also called Lysa Hora or Łysa Góra, (Polish: Łysa Góra, Ukrainian: Лиса гора, Lysa hora; Russian: Лысая гора, Lysaya gora) is a location in Slavic folk mythology related to witchcraft. According to legends, witches periodically gather on the "bald mountains" for the Witches' Sabbath.

The exact origins and factual evidence of the concept are unclear. Notable "bald mountains" include the Łysa Góra in Poland, Lysá hora, Lysa Hora and Zamkova Hora hills in Kyiv, Ukraine.

== Cultural references ==
- Night on Bald Mountain (musical composition by Modest Mussorgsky and Nikolay Rimsky-Korsakov inspired by the legend)
- A Bald Mountain can be found in Mikhail Bulgakov's The Master and Margarita as the mountain where the Iyeshua (Jesus of Nazareth) was crucified and it is the location of a sabbath in which Margarita takes part.
- In 1970s, in Belarus, an anonymous poem A Tale of the Bald Mountain (Сказ пра Лысую гару) was widely circulated by samizdat. It ridiculed the "sabbath" by the members of the Belarusian Union of Soviet Writers, who quarreled during the allocation of dachas for them.
- In Monday Begins on Saturday, a 1965 science fantasy novel by Soviet writers Boris and Arkady Strugatsky, the witch Naina Kyivna, the landlady of the protagonist regularly flies to Lysaya Gora for what is called "Annual Republican Convention".
- Łysa Góra (Elder Speech: Ard Cerbin) is a location in the role-playing game The Witcher 3: Wild Hunt. The mountain is the setting of a yearly ritual where the Sisters of the Bog, three ancient, powerful, demon-like witches, grant their favour to local peasants who worship them. During the game's story, main characters Geralt of Rivia and Ciri assault the ritual to assassinate the sisters and their guest of honor, Imlerith, a captain of the Wild Hunt.

== See also ==
- Hill of Witches, Lithuania
- Lysa Hora (disambiguation)
- Walpurgis Night

Other locations for witches' sabbath in folklore

- Blockula (Blåkulla), Sweden
- Brocken, Germany
- Kyöpelinvuori, Finland
- Šatrija, Lithuania
