= Gołoszyce =

- Village
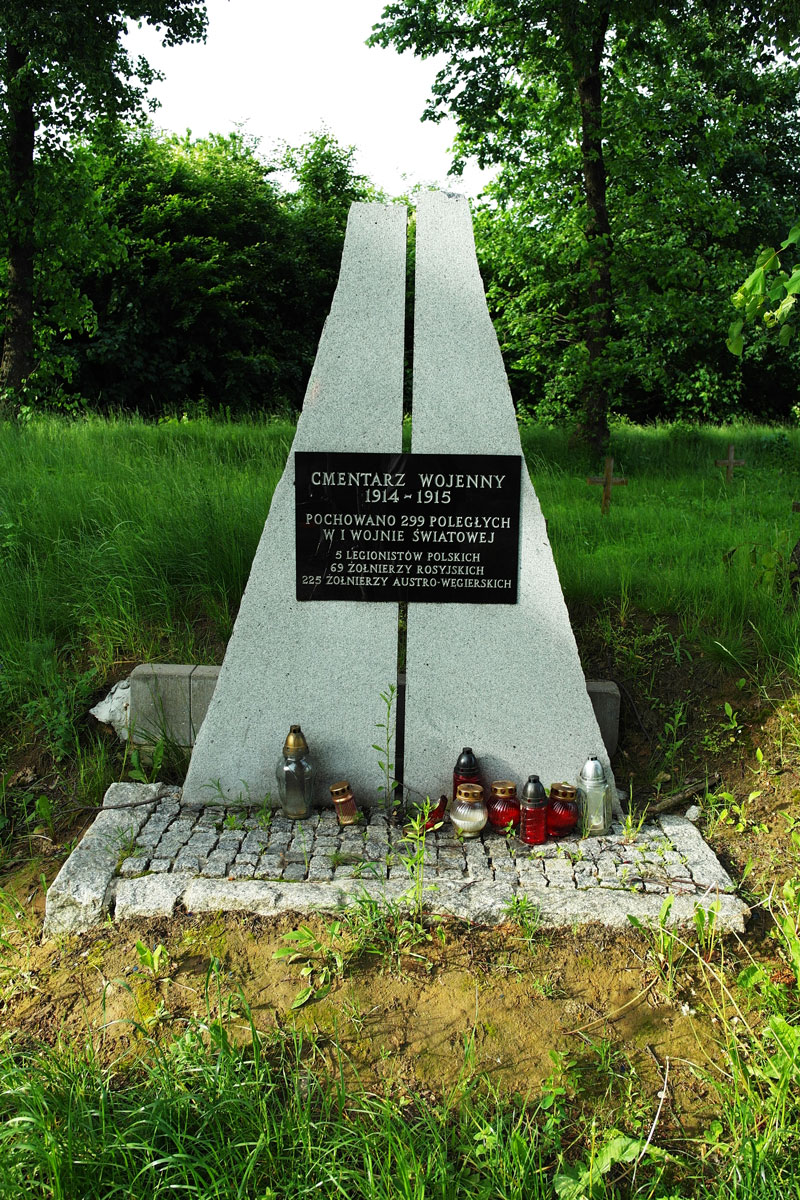

- Location within Poland
- Coordinates: 50°48′0″N 21°17′5″E
- Country: Poland
- Voivodeship: Świętokrzyskie
- County: Opatów
- Gmina: Baćkowice
- Population: 280

Gołoszyce [ɡɔwɔˈʂɨt͡sɛ] is a village in the administrative district of Gmina Baćkowice, within Opatów County, Świętokrzyskie Voivodeship, in south-central Poland. It lies approximately 4 km (2 mi) east of Baćkowice, 10 km (6 mi) west of Opatów, and 48 km (30 mi) east of the regional capital Kielce.
