= Gmina Baćkowice =

Gmina Baćkowice Baćkowice Commune
- Gmina
- Interactive map of Gmina Baćkowice
- Coordinates (Baćkowice): 50°47′45″N 21°13′54″E
- Country: Poland
- Voivodeship: Świętokrzyskie
- County: Opatów
- Seat: Baćkowice

Area
  - Total: 96.25 km^{2} (37.16 sq mi)

Population (2006)
  - Total: 5,177
  - Density: 53.79/km^{2} (139.3/sq mi)
- Website: http://www.backowice-gmina.pl/

Gmina Baćkowice is a rural gmina (administrative district) in Opatów County, Świętokrzyskie Voivodeship, in south-central Poland. Its seat is the village of Baćkowice, which lies approximately 14 kilometres (9 mi) west of Opatów and 45 km (28 mi) east of the regional capital Kielce.

The gmina covers an area of 96.25 square kilometres (37.2 sq mi), and as of 2006 its total population is 5,177.

The gmina contains part of the protected area called Jeleniowska Landscape Park.

== Villages ==
Gmina Baćkowice contains the villages and settlements of Baćkowice, Baranówek, Gołoszyce, Janczyce, Modliborzyce, Nowy Nieskurzów, Olszownica, Oziębłów, Piórków, Piórków-Kolonia, Piskrzyn, Rudniki, Stary Nieskurzów, Wszachów and Żerniki.

== Neighbouring gminas ==
Gmina Baćkowice is bordered by the gminas of Iwaniska, Łagów, Opatów, Sadowie and Waśniów.
