= Łysa Góra =

Mountain in Poland

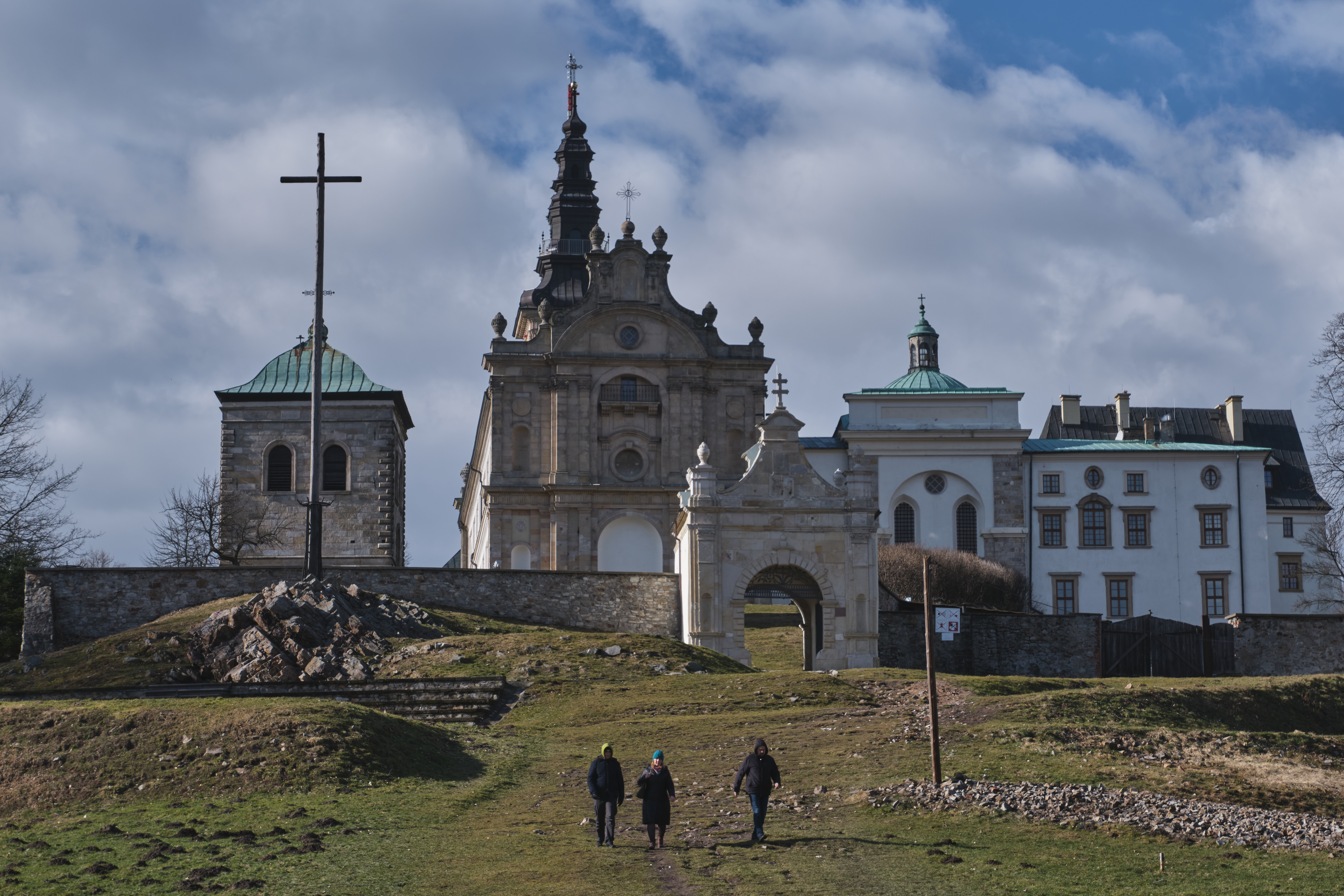
- Monastery on Łysa Góra

Highest point
- Elevation: 595 m (1,952 ft)
- Coordinates: 50°50′28″N 21°03′24″E

Naming
- English translation: Bald Mountain
- Language of name: Polish

Geography
- Location within Świętokrzyskie Voivodeship Location within Poland
- Location: Poland
- Parent range: Łysogóry, Świętokrzyskie Mountains

Historic Monument of Poland
- Designated: 2017-03-15
- Reference no.: Dz. U. z 2017 r. poz. 663

Łysa Góra [ˈwɨsa ˈɡura], translated as Bald Mountain, is a well-known hill in Świętokrzyskie Mountains, Poland. With a height of 595 metres (1,952 ft), it is the second highest point in that range (after Łysica at 612 meters or 2,008 ft). On its slopes and atop its summit are several hiking trails, the ruins of a pagan wall from 9th century, the Benedictine monastery from the 11th century, and the Święty Krzyż TV Tower. The mountain also features prominently in a local legend about witches' sabbaths.

== Names ==
Former or corresponding names of the site include Łysica and Święty Krzyż.

== Location ==
Łysa Góra, composed primarily of quartzite and Cambrian slates, lies in the eastern part of the Łysogóry range, and is the second largest peak of the larger Świętokrzyskie Mountains (after Łysica). A notable summit within the Świętokrzyski National Park, it is a vital point in many sightseeing trails of the region. The blue path to Pętkowice begins here, and the red path from Gołoszyce to Kuźniaki passes through here.

== Notable landmarks ==
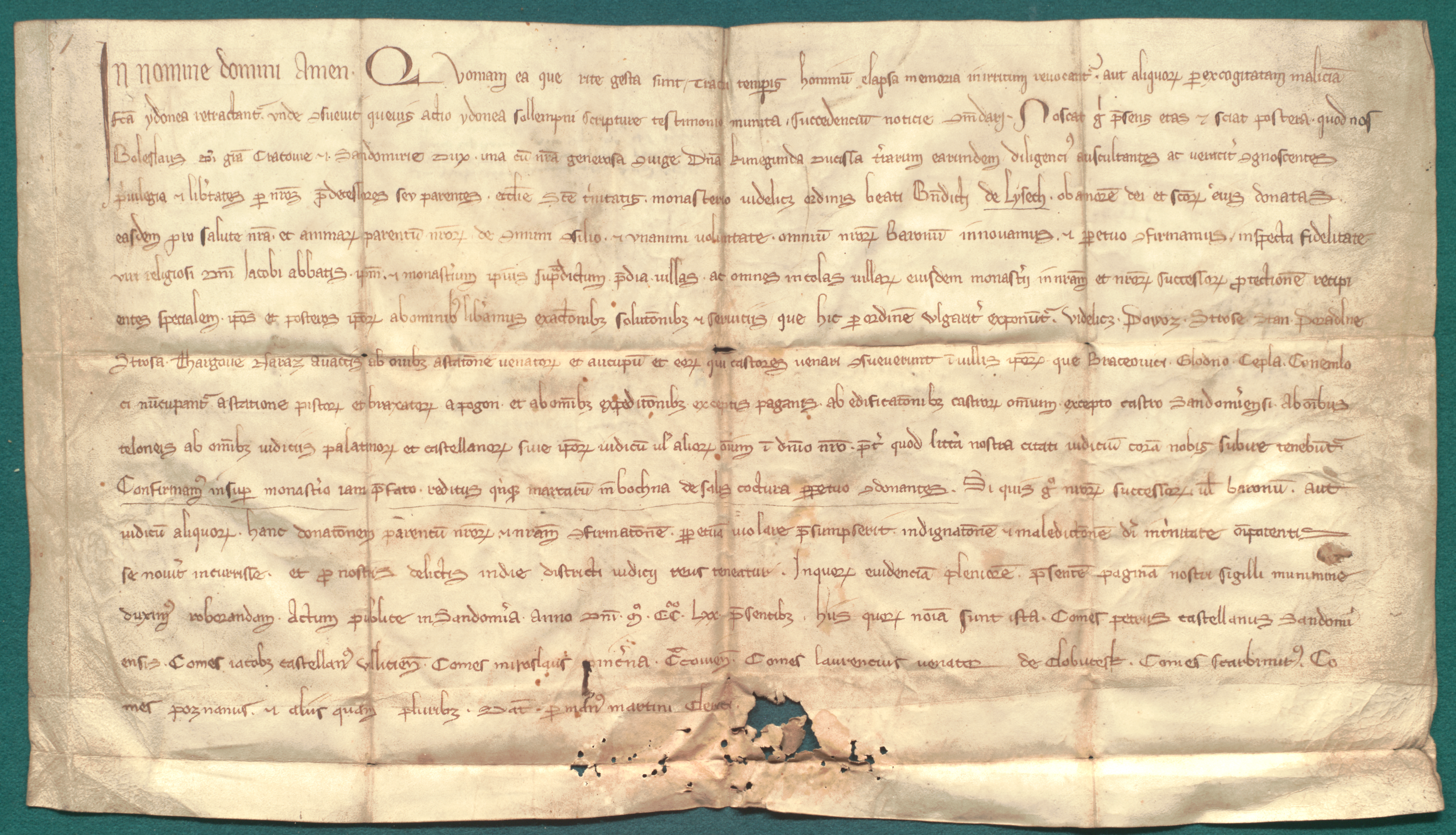
Document of Polish ruler Bolesław V the Chaste from 1270 confirming the old privileges of the Holy Cross Monastery

During the times of prehistory of Poland, Łysa Góra was likely a sacred mountain and a site of a pagan temple of three gods, mentioned in the Annals of medieval chronicler Jan Długosz. There are remains of a quartzite U-shaped wall surrounding the higher part of the hill, with length of about 1.5 km and height of 2 m from 8th-10th centuries. The temple was abandoned after the baptism of Poland in the late 10th century. The legend about witches' sabbaths is likely related to the old cult.

On the site of the pagan temple the Benedictine monastery of Holy Cross (Święty Krzyż) was founded (according to a legend, in 1006, by king of Poland, Bolesław I the Brave, but most sources give the 11th century). The monastery was named after a fragment from Christ' Cross which was supposedly enshrined there, and was a site of frequent pilgrimages.

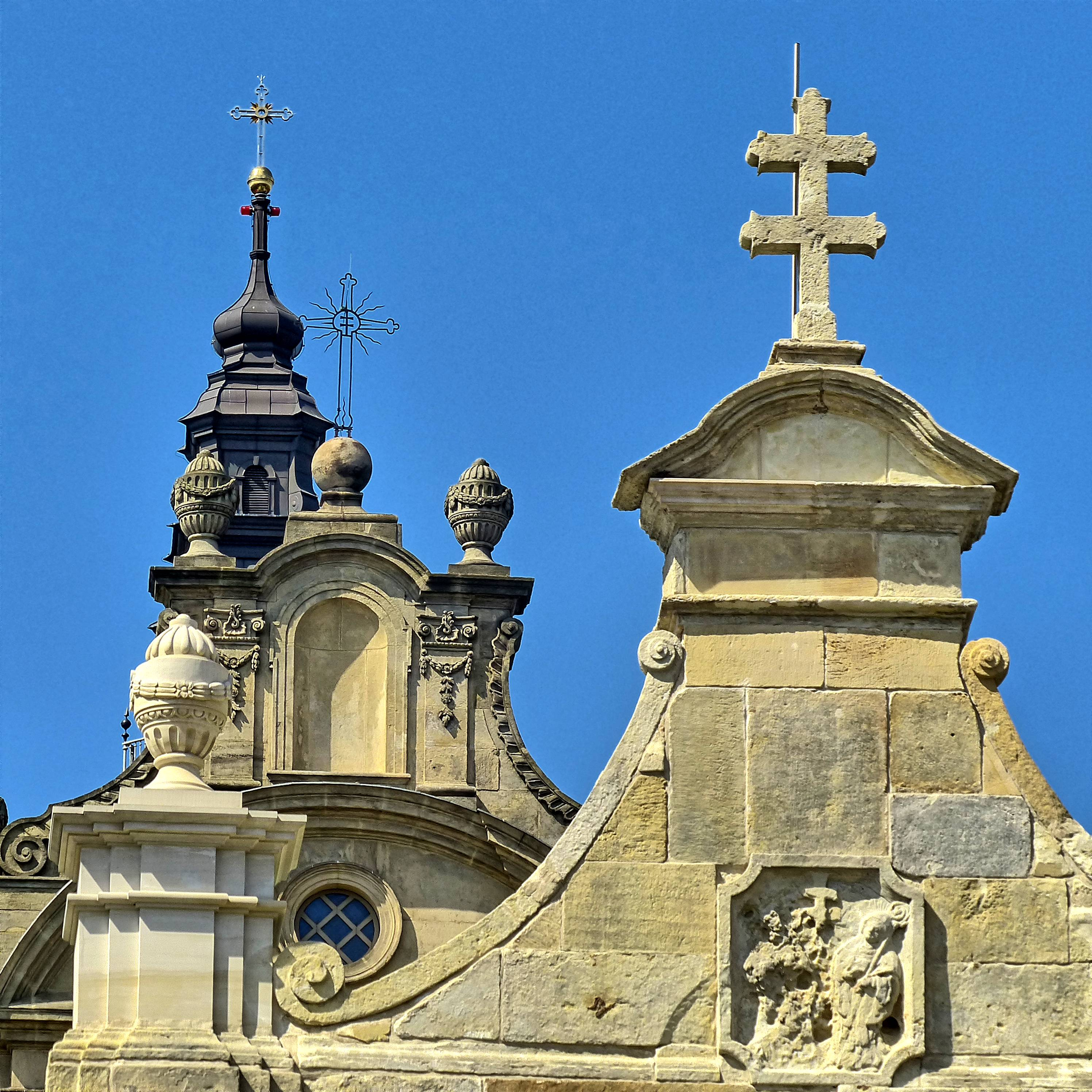
Baroque architectural detail

The monastery was destroyed and rebuilt several times throughout its history, with the most significant destruction taking place in the 19th and 20th centuries. After the Partitions of Poland, the Russian Empire took over the building in 1819 and converted it into a prison. It was partially restored during the interwar period (1918–1939), under the Second Polish Republic. During World War II, the German occupiers murdered the abbot of the monastery during a massacre of Poles committed on 12 June 1940 in Kielce (Nazi persecution of the Catholic Church in Poland). and the monastery was taken over by the Nazi Germany and used as a prison and execution site of Soviet prisoners of war (about 6,000 perished here). The Soviet prisoners executed by the Nazis are buried in a mass grave near the peak. At the bottom of the hill, there is a monument to Poles who died in the Katyn massacre.

After the war, the Polish communist government transferred the building to the Świętokrzyski National Park, which renovated parts of them. Currently the National Park has a museum in some of the former buildings, while a part has been taken over by another religious institute (Missionary Oblates of Mary Immaculate). Due to its cultural and historical importance, the abbey complex is listed as a Historic Monument of Poland. The abbey, although now past its Golden Age, has given its names to the Świętokrzyskie Mountains range as well as the Świętokrzyskie Voivodeship itself. The abbey also holds some mummified bodies; one of them is rumored (but not confirmed) to belong to Prince Jeremi Wiśniowiecki.

Another notable building found on the hill is the Święty Krzyż TV Tower; the tallest free-standing TV tower in Poland. Built in 1966, it is a 157-metre-tall (515 ft) concrete tower.

In 2018, a khachkar was unveiled at Święty Krzyż.

== Interesting facts ==
Łysa Góra is so far the only place from where both the capital of Poland (Warsaw) as well the Tatra Mountains can be seen.

== Gallery ==
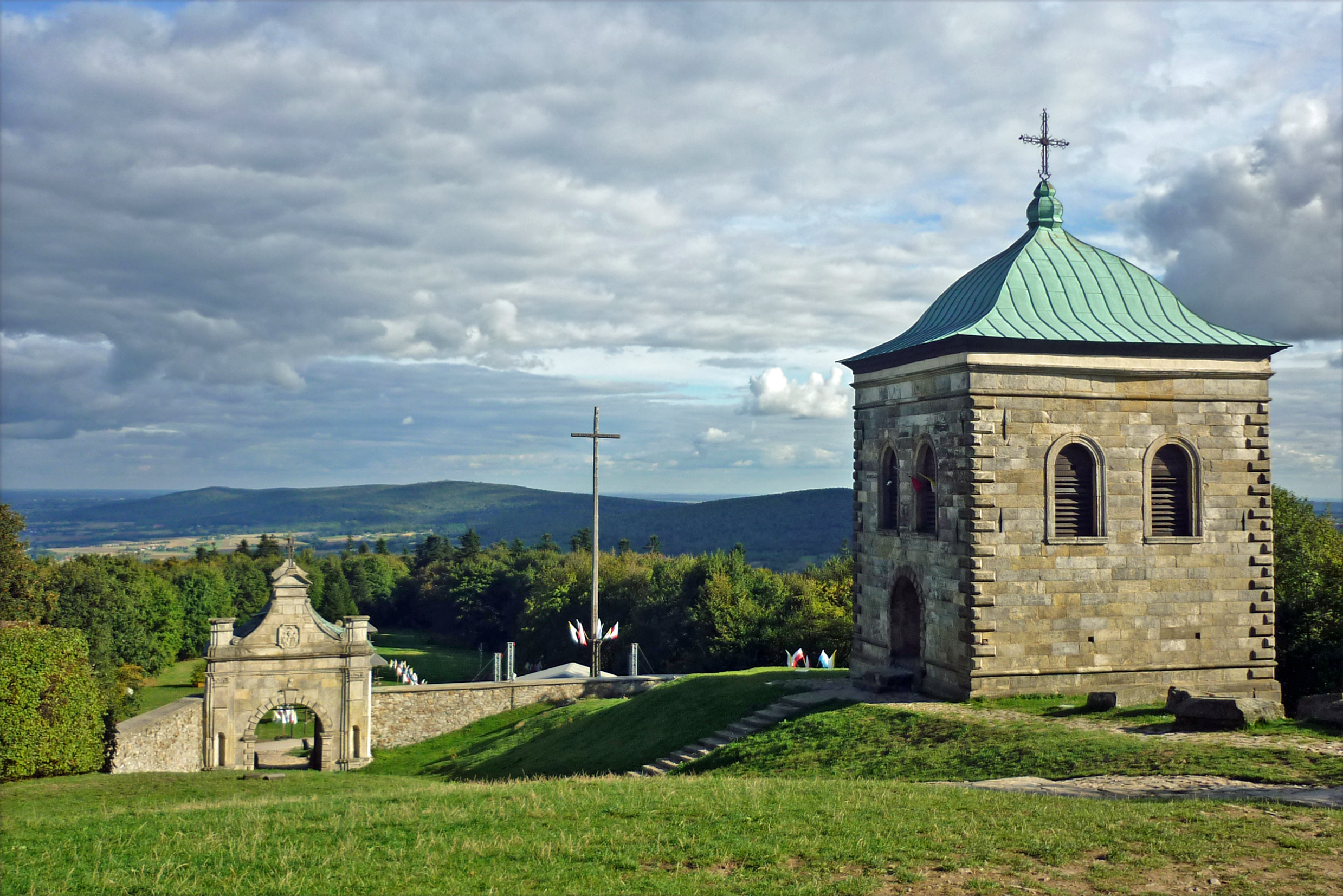
The surrounding panoramic view from Łysa Góra

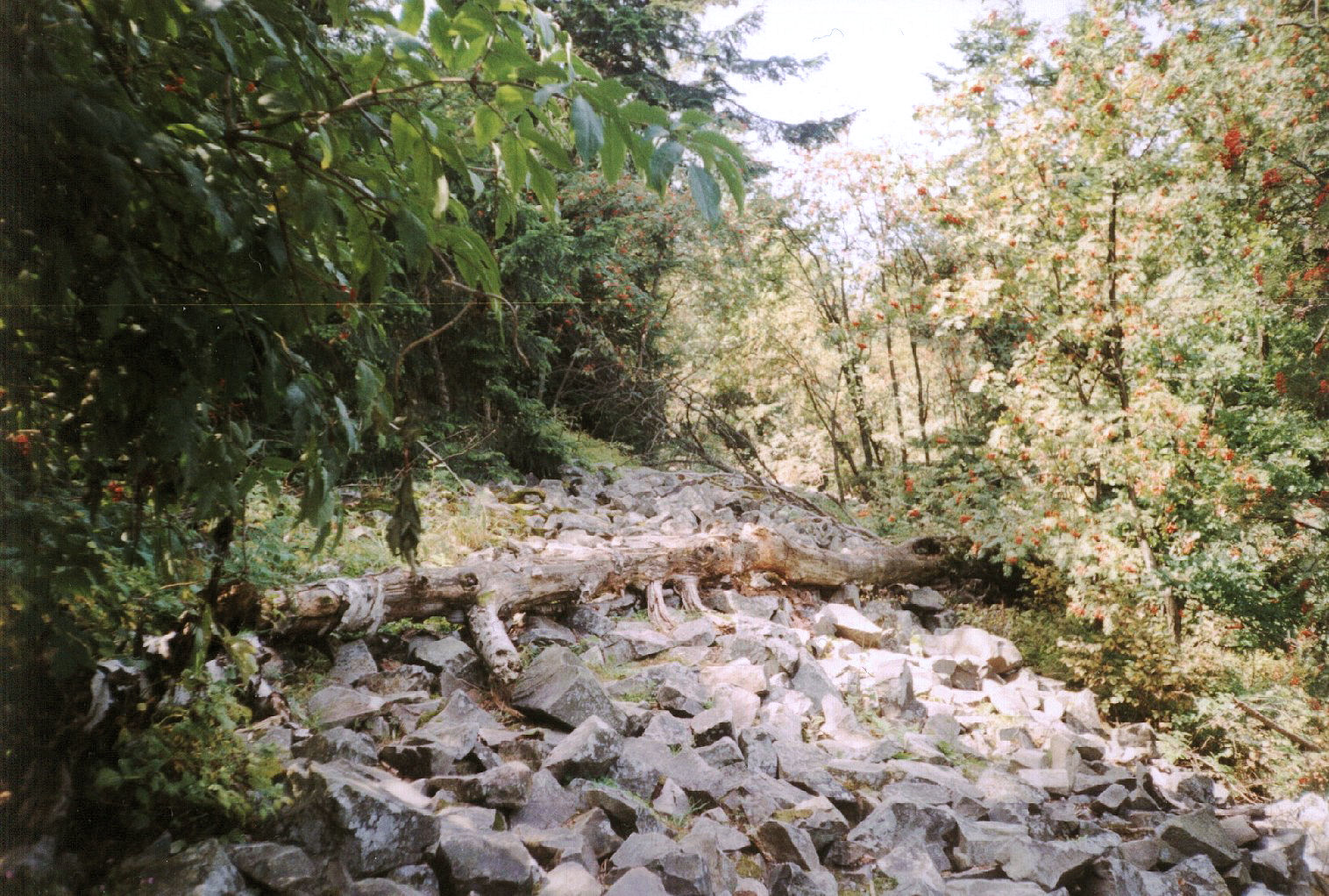
Remains of the pagan wall

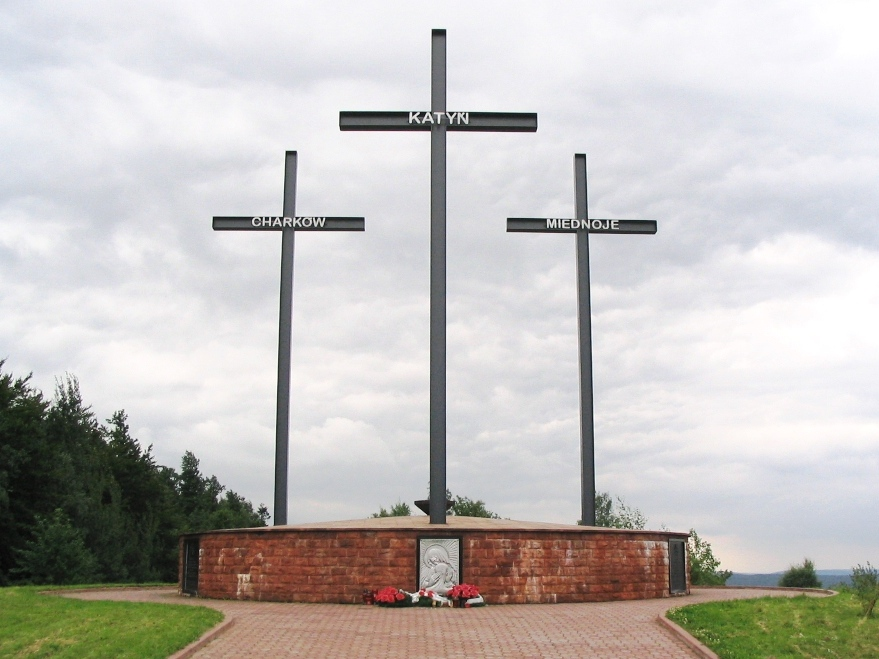
Katyn massacre memorial

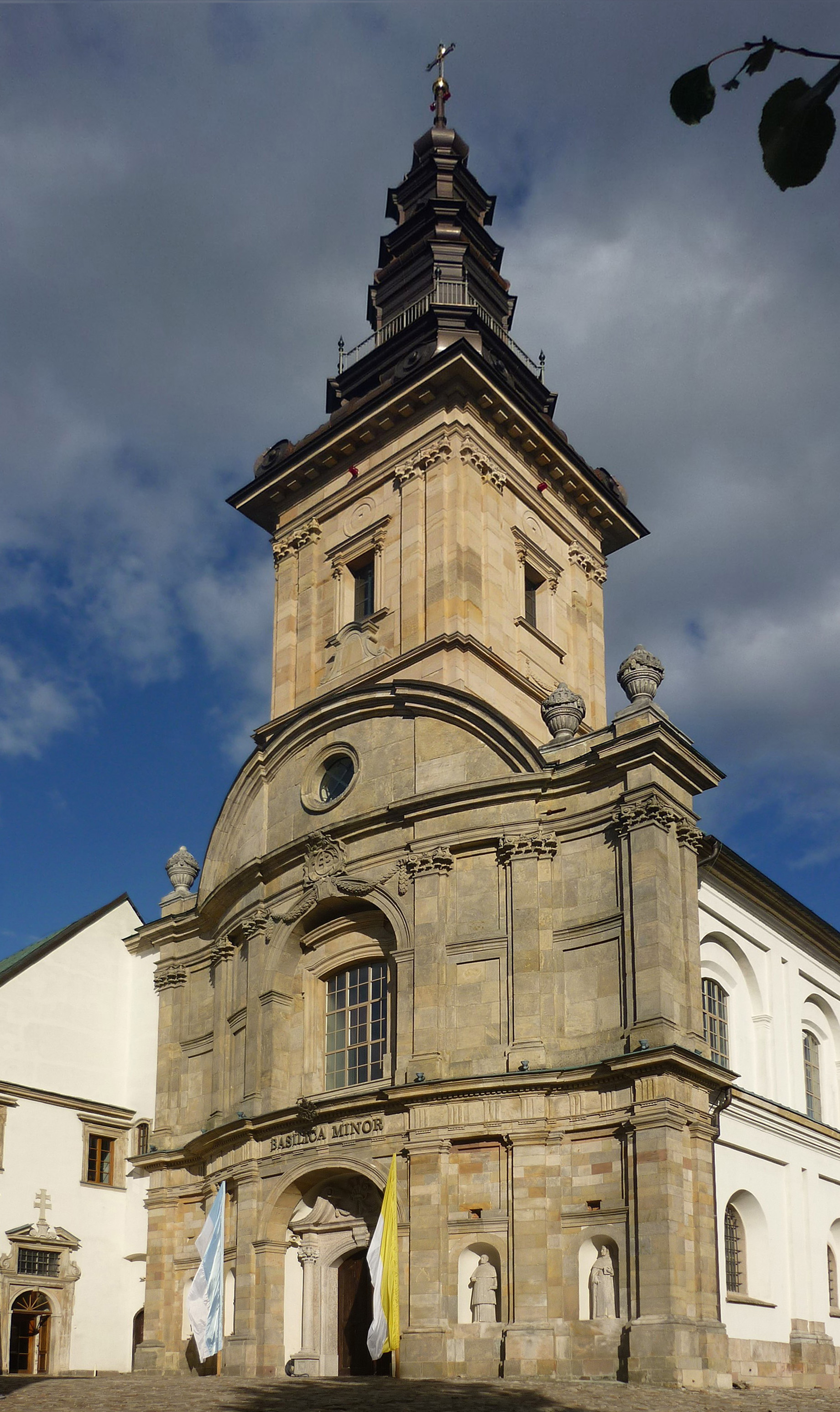
Bell tower

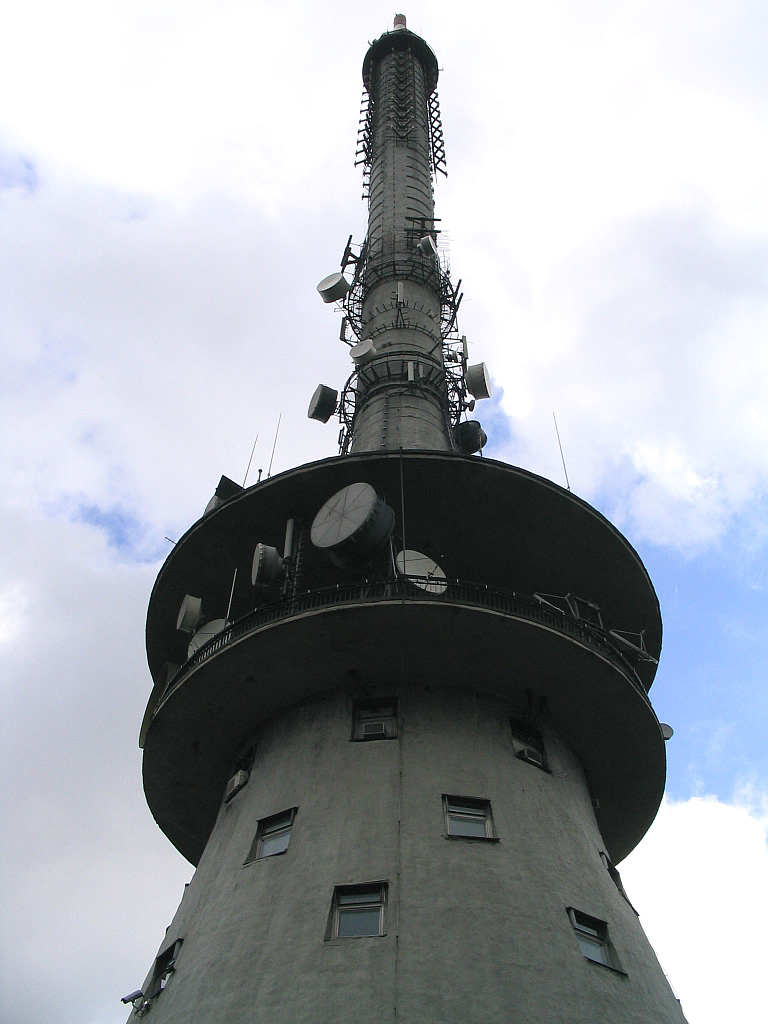
Święty Krzyż TV Tower

== See also ==
- Brocken
- Lysa Hora
