= Świętokrzyskie Mountains =

Mountain range in Poland

- Holy Cross Mountains
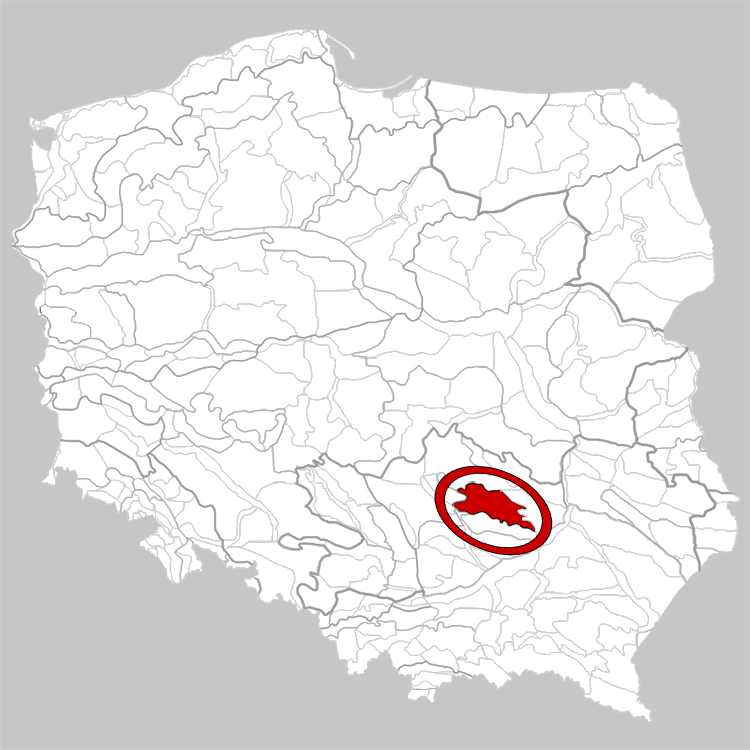
- Świętokrzyskie Mountains

Highest point
- Peak: Łysica
- Elevation: 614 m (2,014 ft)
- Coordinates: 50°54′N 20°54′E

Geography
- Country: Poland

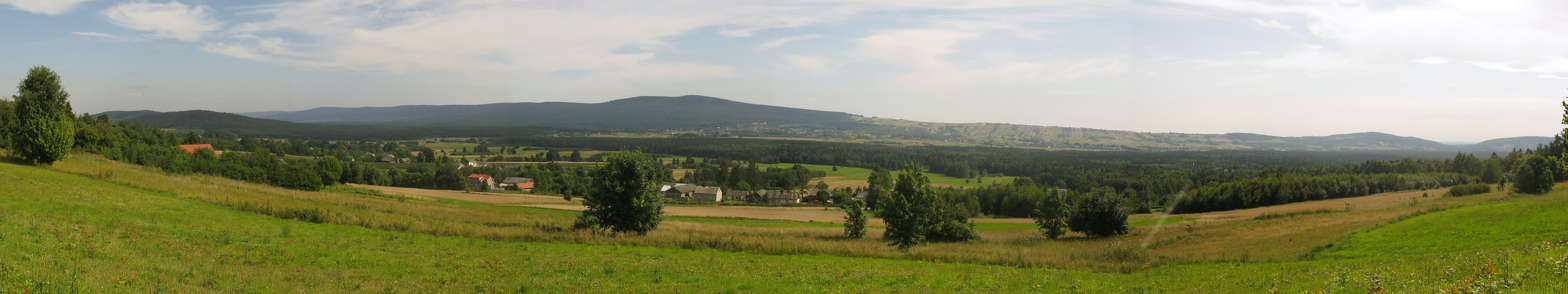
Świętokrzyskie Mountains

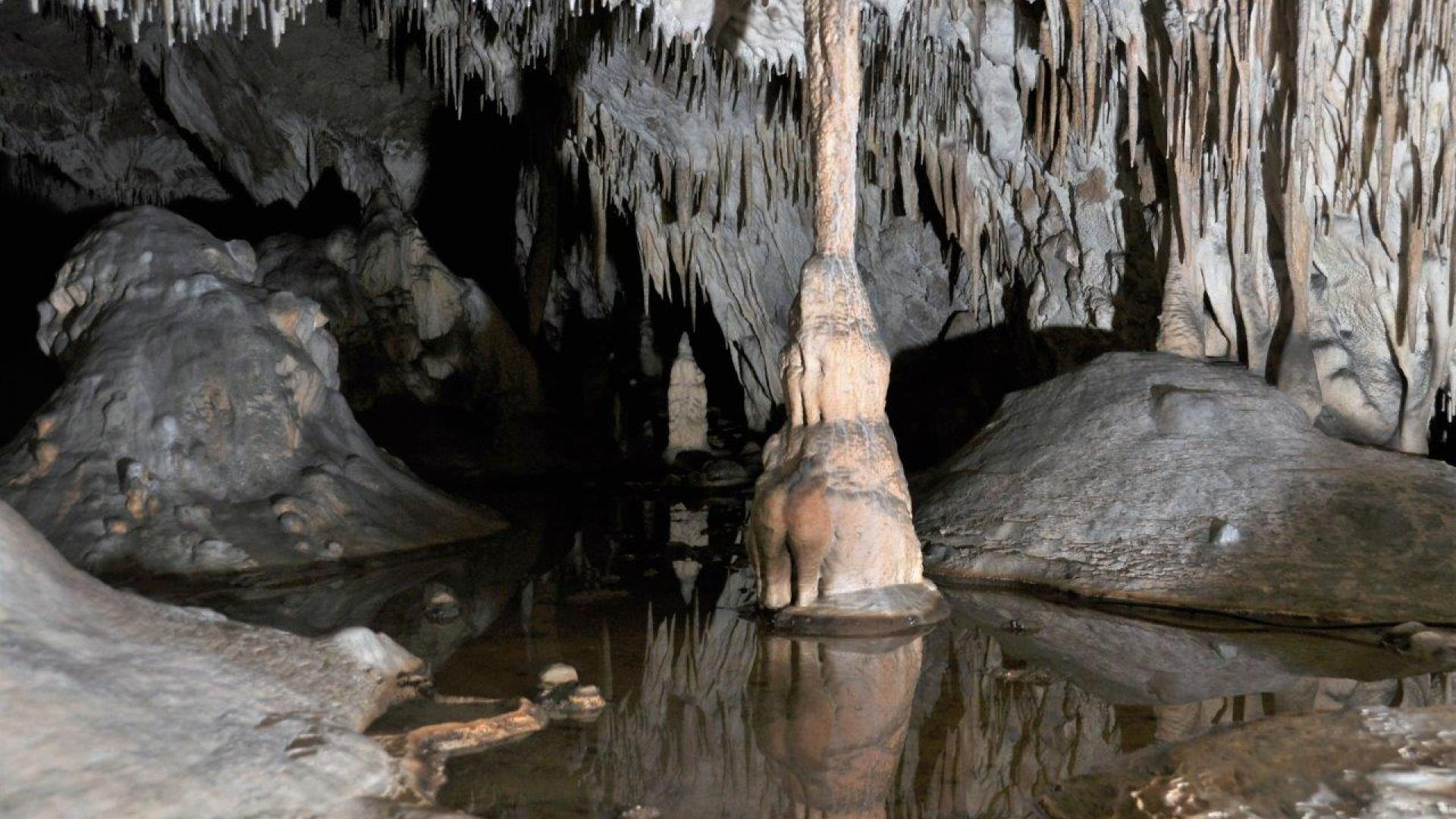
Paradise Cave (Jaskinia Raj) has many well-preserved karst forms

The Świętokrzyskie Mountains (Polish: Góry Świętokrzyskie, IPA: [ˈɡurɨ ɕfjɛntɔˈkʂɨskʲɛ]), often anglicized to Holy Cross Mountains, are a mountain range in central Poland, near the city of Kielce.

The mountain range comprises several lesser ranges, the highest of which is Łysogóry (literally "Bald Mountains").

The two highest peaks are Łysica, 614 m (2014.44 ft), and Łysa Góra, 594 m (1948.81 ft).

Together with the Jura Krakowsko-Częstochowska and some other regions, the mountains form a region called the Lesser-Poland Upland (Wyżyna Małopolska). Geologically speaking, the Holy Cross Mountains possess also a margin which extends further than the mountains themselves; the Owadów–Brzezinki palaeontological site is situated in the margin of the Holy Cross Mountains, but not in the mountains themselves.

They cover an area of 1684 km^{2} (650 mi^{2}).

The approximate location is 50°53′N 20°55′E.

== Prehistory ==
The Świętokrzyskie Mountains are one of the oldest mountain ranges in Europe. They were formed during the Caledonian orogeny of the Silurian period and then rejuvenated in the Hercynian orogeny of the Late Carboniferous period.

The region was once on the southern coast of the ancient supercontinent of Laurasia. The oldest known evidence of tetrapods comes from 395-million-year old fossil footprints found in Zachełmie. The rocks were formed from a marine tidal flat or lagoon.

The mountains have also yielded the oldest evidence of Dinosauromorpha, pushing back the evolution of dinosaurs to small, four-legged animals living during the Early Triassic period. The fossil footprints date to some 250 million years ago, only a couple of million years after the Permian–Triassic extinction event, during a time when the environment was still destabilized. Footprints of early bipedal dinosaurs known as Sphingopus, from 246 million years ago, have also been found.

== History ==
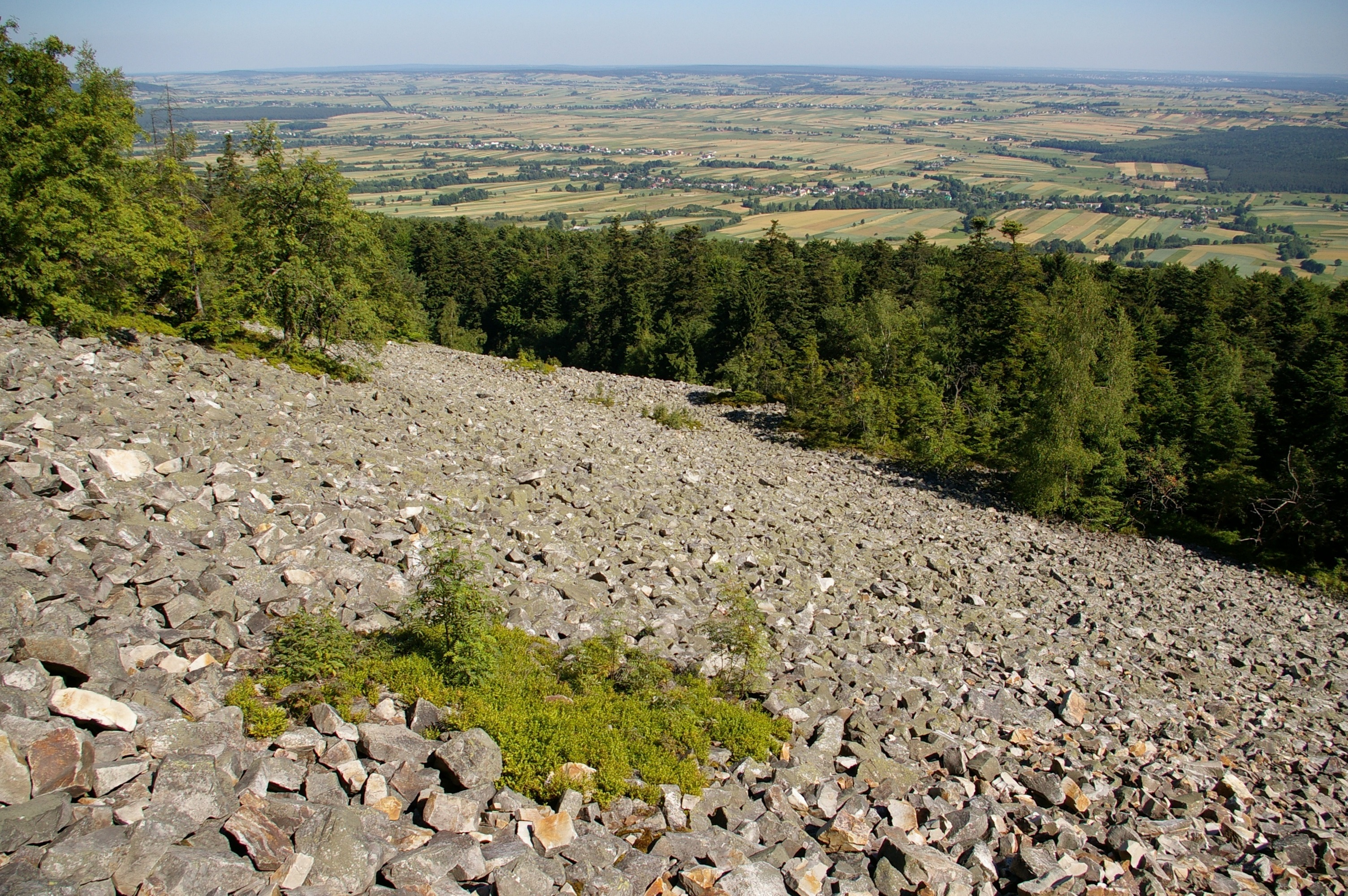
Mountain rock rubble (Gołoborze)

From the early Middle Ages the mountains were a place of extensive copper and iron mining. Later they were also a significant site of limestone and red sandstone extraction. The central part of the mountains now contains the Świętokrzyski National Park.

The name "Holy Cross Mountains" refers to a Christian relic from a nearby Benedictine monastery on Łysa Góra, said to be a small piece of wood from the Cross on which Jesus Christ was crucified.

The region saw some significant partisan activity during World War II (see Detached Unit of the Polish Army, Holy Cross Mountains Brigade).

== Climate ==
The climate of the Świętokrzyskie Mountains differs from the surrounding regions. The average annual temperature is 6–7 °C. The yearly rainfall ranges from 650 to 900mm. The highest peaks are covered in snow from November to April. The ice sheet persist on average 50–90 days a year. The vegetation period of the highest parts of the mountains is two weeks shorter than in Warsaw and is about 200 days. Temperature inversion occurs – the temperature on the heated slopes can be up to 5 °C higher than in the bottoms of the valleys, located several dozen meters below.

== Nature conservation ==
In order to protect unique values of Świętokrzyskie Mountains Świętokrzyski National Park was established in 1950. Moreover, many areas are protected by several nature parks, reserves and Natura 2000 areas.

Nature parks in Świętokrzyskie mountains:

- Jeleniowska Landscape Park
- Cisów-Orłowiny Landscape Park
- Suchedniów-Oblęgorek Landscape Park
- Sieradowice Landscape Park
- Chęciny-Kielce Landscape Park

== See also ==
- Bartek the most famous tree in Poland
- Caledonian orogeny
- Holy Cross Province
