= Łysica =

Mountain in Poland

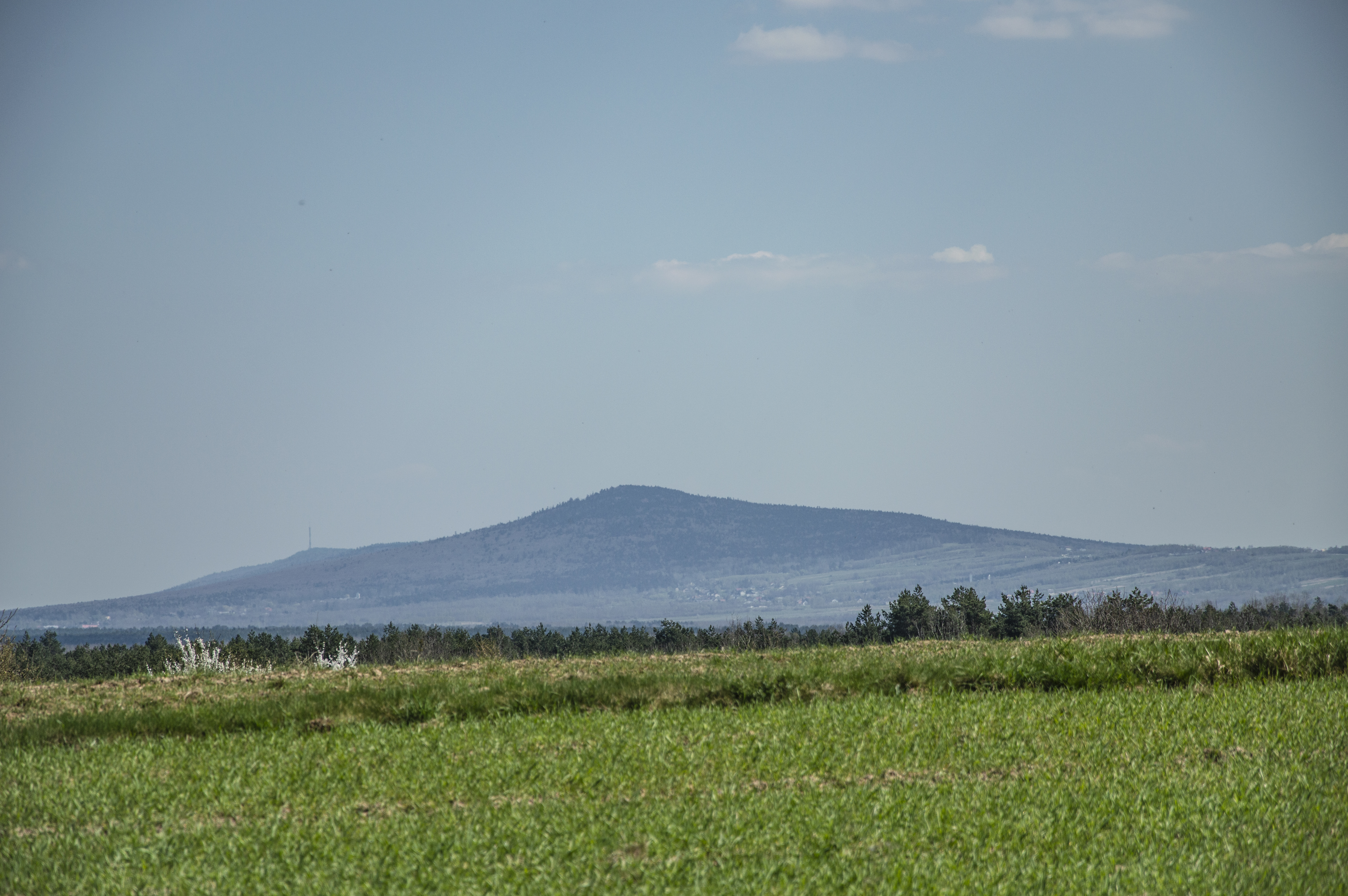

Highest point
- Elevation: 614 m (2,014 ft)
- Coordinates: 50°54′N 20°54′E

Geography
- Location within Świętokrzyskie Voivodeship Location within Poland
- Location: Poland
- Parent range: Świętokrzyskie Mountains

Łysica [ˈwɨˈɕit͡sa] is the highest mountain in the Świętokrzyskie Mountains of Poland. Its height is 614 metres (2,014 ft). It is located in the Świętokrzyski National Park and there is an abbey below it, on a site that might have been a pagan temple in the times before Christianization of Poland.

Łysica, which is also called Góra Świętej Katarzyny (St. Catherine's Mountain) lies in western part of the Łysogóry range, near the village of Święta Katarzyna. It belongs to the Crown of Polish Mountains ("Korona Gór Polskich"), as it is the highest mountain of Holy Cross Mountains. Łysica has two peaks - western (613 m) and eastern Skała Agaty ("Agatha's Rock") or Zamczysko (614 m).

The mountain is made of quartzite and slate, its northern and southern slopes are marked by the stone run. Furthermore, on the southern slope, at the height of 590 meters, there is a small bog. Most of Łysica is covered by a forest, near the peak there are fir trees, below which are beeches. Łysica is inhabited by birds of prey, such as the lesser spotted eagle, the Eurasian sparrowhawk, and the Eurasian hobby.

== See also ==
- Łysa Góra
