= Świętokrzyski National Park =

National park in Poland

- Świętokrzyski Park Narodowy
- IUCN category II (national park)
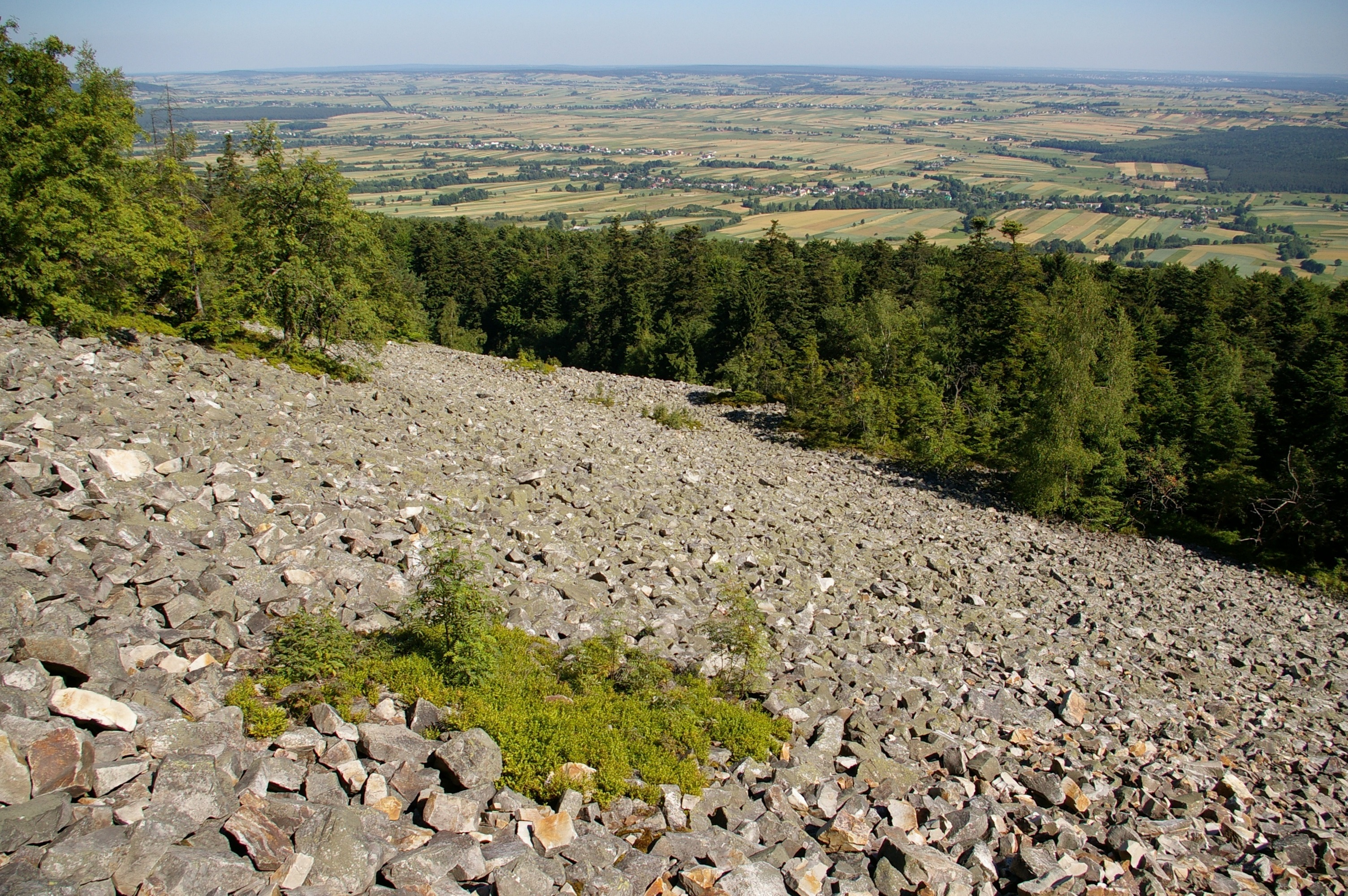
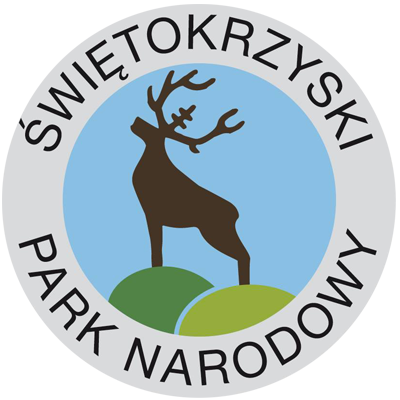
- Stone run at Świętokrzyski National Park Park logo

- Location within Poland
- Location: Świętokrzyskie Voivodeship, Poland
- Coordinates: 50.876°N 20.978°E
- Area: 76.26 km^{2} (29.44 sq mi)
- Established: 1950
- Governing body: Ministry of the Environment
- Website: Official website

Świętokrzyski National Park (Polish: Świętokrzyski Park Narodowy) is a National Park in Świętokrzyskie Voivodeship in central Poland. It covers the highest ridge of the Świętokrzyskie (Holy Cross) Mountains – the Łysogory – with its two highest peaks: Łysica at 612 metres (2,008 ft) and Łysa Góra ("Bald Mountain") at 595 m (1,952 ft). It also covers the eastern part of the Klonowski Ridge and part of the Pokrzywianski Ridge. The park has its headquarters in Bodzentyn.

== History ==
The history of efforts to protect this part of Poland dates back to the times before World War I. In 1921 a first forest reserve in the Swiętokrzyskie mountains was created – this was Józef Kostyrko's reserve on Chełmowa Góra (1.63 km^{2}). The following year, two parts of the Łysogory with a total area of 3.11 km^{2} also became protected. In 1932 the area of the reserve was officially expanded to 13.47 km^{2}, but the National Park was not created until 1950. Its initial area was 60.54 km^{2}, but it has since been expanded to 76.26 square kilometres (29.44 sq mi), of which 72.12 km^{2} is forested. There are five strictly protected zones with a total area of 17.31 km^{2}.

== Landscape ==
The Świętokrzyskie Mountains are the oldest in Poland. Elevated in three different tectonic periods, they spread out in the Małopolska Upland, between Pilica and the Vistula. Their outlines are gentle and their heights are small. However, they fascinate with the extremely original structure, varied vegetation and the animal world.

== Flora ==
The park is famous for its trees, of which 674 are regarded as monuments of nature and as such are under protection. Park authorities successfully managed to reintroduce yew trees here – now there are around 1300 of them. Most of the park's area is forested, mainly with pines and beeches. Fir trees are less numerous as well as forests of mixed oak-fir character. Among the park's curiosities we must emphasize the endemic, unique only for this area, fir wilderness and areas of Polish larch on Chełmowa Góra.

== Fauna ==
The park's fauna is represented by more than 4000 species of invertebrates and 210 species of vertebrae (including 187 protected). One of local animal's life most precious features is the fact that many of species are of mountainous kind. These usually thrive in the strictly protected areas and deep in the forests.

== Architecture ==
Apart from nature, the park and its vicinity has a lot more to offer. There are several important architectural relics, most of which of sacral character. The most precious is the Benedictine Holy Cross Abbey from the first half of the 12th century, located on the peak of Łysa Góra. It is probable that here the oldest example of Polish writing was created – Kazania Świętoktrzyskie (Holy Cross Sermons). An interesting feature of the local landscape is the numerous roadside chapels.

Other fine examples of architecture are situated beyond the park's limits. These are: female monastery at Św. Katarzyna (1633), churches at Bielice (17th century) and Bodzentynów (15th century), ruins of a castle at Bodzentyn (14th century), parts of rampart around Łysa Góra (9th century) and museum of metallurgy at Słupia Nowa, where occasionally ancient method of producing steel is presented to tourists. The park has many historical monuments connected with Polish national uprisings and the time of Nazi occupation.
