= Baćkowice =

- Village
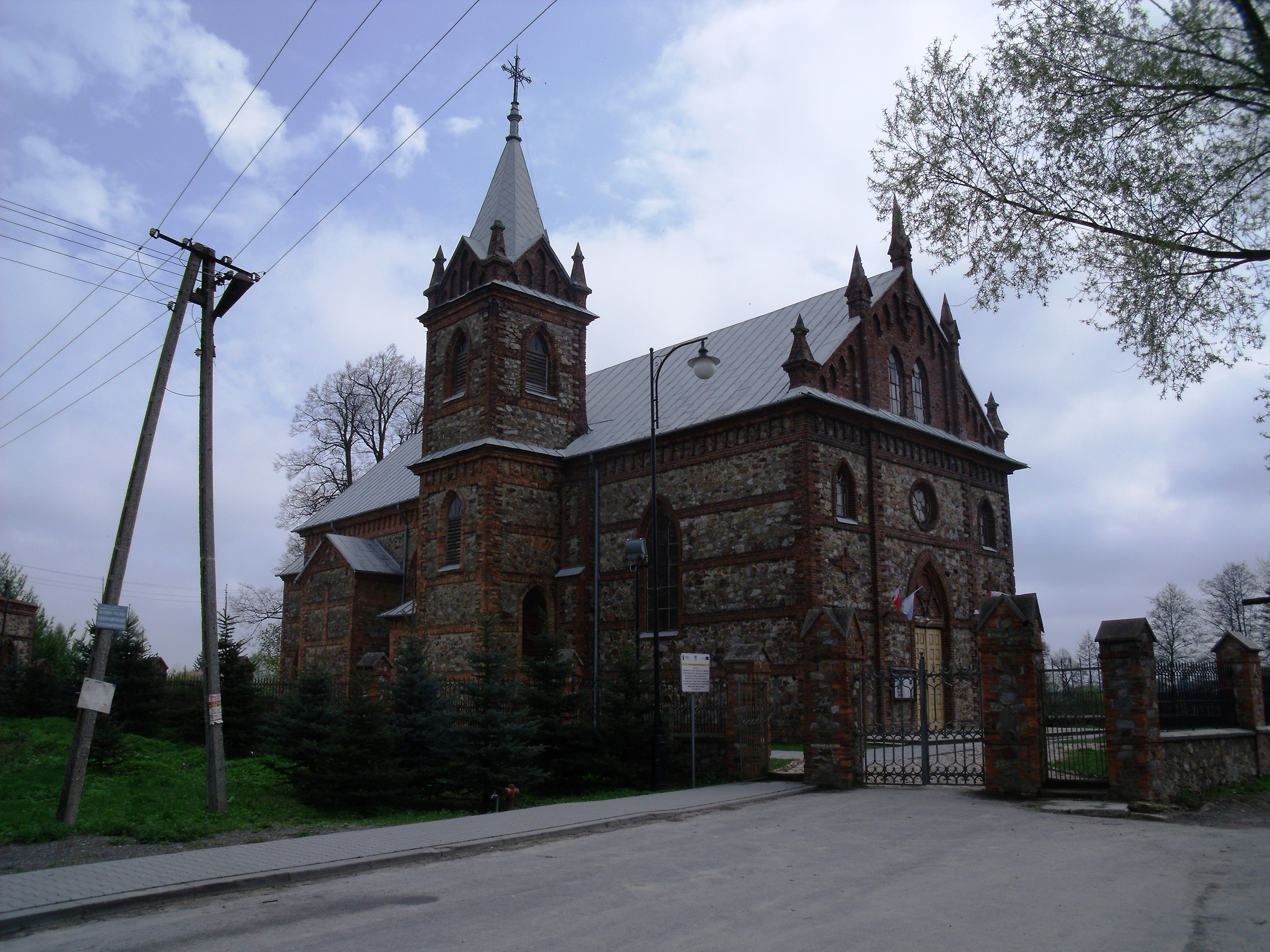
- Church of Saint Nicholas

- Location within Poland
- Coordinates: 50°47′45″N 21°13′54″E
- Country: Poland
- Voivodeship: Świętokrzyskie
- County: Opatów
- Gmina: Baćkowice

Population
  - Total: 540

Baćkowice [bat͡ɕkɔˈvit͡sɛ] is a village in Opatów County, Świętokrzyskie Voivodeship, in south-central Poland. It is the seat of the gmina (administrative district) called Gmina Baćkowice. It lies approximately 14 km (9 mi) west of Opatów and 45 km (28 mi) east of the regional capital Kielce.

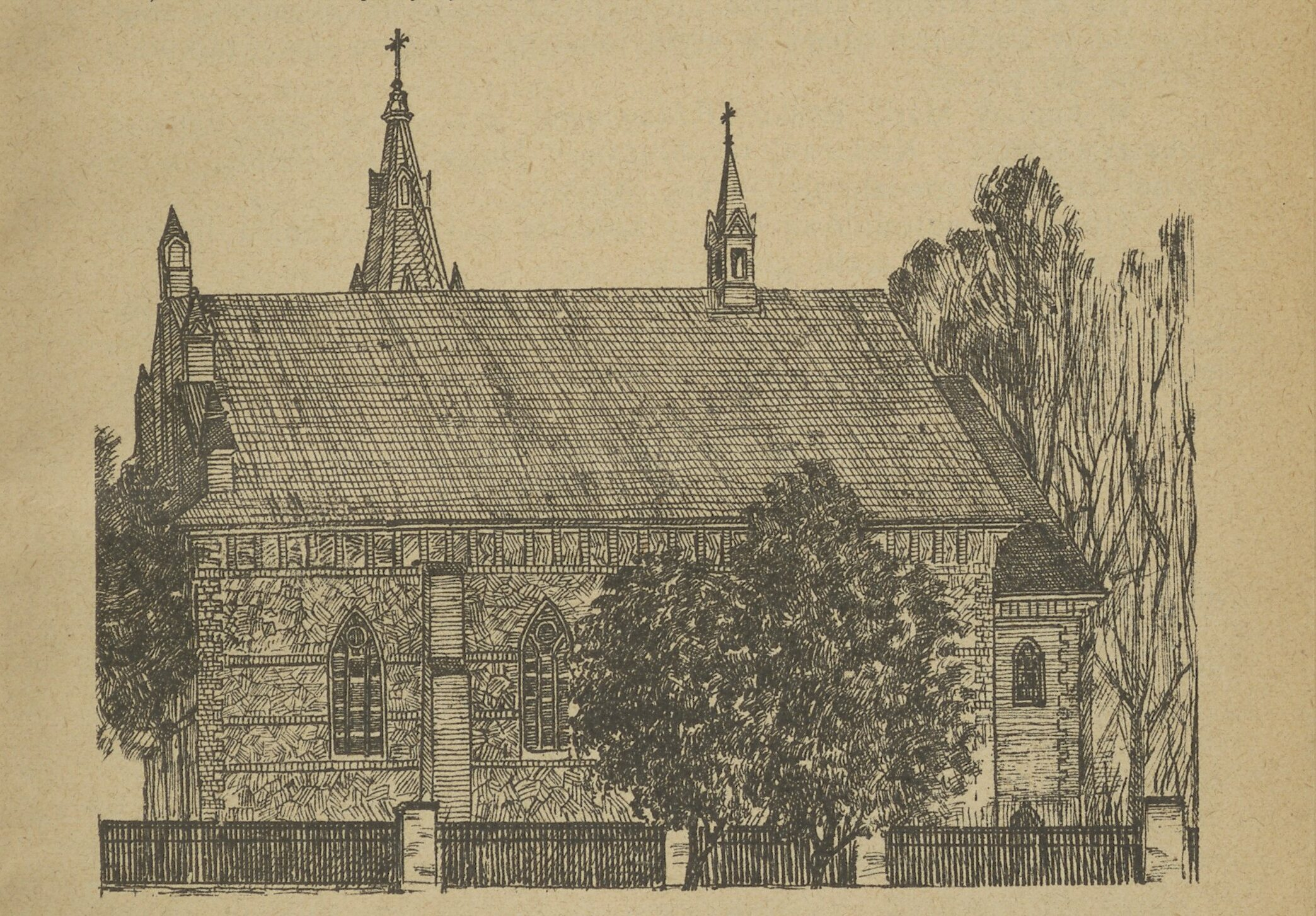
Saint Nicholas church, before 1907
