= Dzierzkowice =

Dzierzkowice may refer to the following places in Poland:

- Dzierżkowice, Lower Silesian Voivodeship (south-west Poland)
- Dzierżkowice, Opole Voivodeship (south-west Poland)
- Gmina Dzierzkowice, Lublin Voivodeship (east Poland)
- Dzierzkowice, seat of Gmina Dzierzkowice, divided into several localities:
  - Dzierzkowice-Góry, a village in Gmina Dzierzkowice
  - Dzierzkowice-Podwody, a village in Gmina Dzierzkowice
  - Dzierzkowice-Rynek, a village in Gmina Dzierzkowice
  - Dzierzkowice-Wola, a village in Gmina Dzierzkowice
  - Dzierzkowice-Zastawie, a village in Gmina Dzierzkowice
