= Boby (disambiguation) =

Boby is a village in Masovian Voivodeship, Poland.

Boby may also refer to:

== People ==
=== First name ===
- Boby John (born 1970), Indian film sound designer
- Boby Singh Dhami (born 2002), Indian field hockey player
- Boby Techi (born 1990), Indian indie pop-folk singer-songwriter

=== Surname ===
- Arambam Boby (born 1975), Indian bodybuilder
- Boby Zavala (born 1991), Mexican luchador
- Gavin Boby (born 1964/1965), British lawyer
- Yaspi Boby (born 1987), Indonesian sprinter

== Places ==
- Boby-Kolonia, a village in Lublin Voivodeship, Poland
- Boby-Księże, a village in Lublin Voivodeship, Poland
- Boby-Wieś, a village in Lublin Voivodeship, Poland

== Others ==
- Helpaphorus boby, species of plume moth
