= Państwowe Wytwórnie Uzbrojenia =

- Type: P.P.
- Predecessor: Centralny Zarząd Wytwórni Wojskowych
- Founded: 1927
- Defunct: 1939
- Fate: Destroyed by Germany in World War II
- Headquarters: Second Polish Republic
- Total assets: 123,600,000 zlotys (1938)
- Number of employees: 12,000
- Subsidiaries: FK, FB, FS, FA, FA nr. 2

Państwowe Wytwórnie Uzbrojenia (PWU, Polish: State Armament Factories) was a Polish state-owned industrial conglomerate. Formed in 1927, the company quickly became the largest defence contractor of inter-war Poland. The company was state-owned, governed by the 9-member Administrative Council and the Director, both directly subordinate to the Minister of Military Affairs. Among the factories belonging to the PWU were:

- Państwowa Fabryka Karabinów ("State Rifle Factory", Warsaw)
- Państwowa Fabryka Broni ("State Arms Factory", Radom)
- Państwowa Fabryka Sprawdzianów ("State Test Equipment Factory", Warsaw)
- Państwowa Fabryka Amunicji ("State Munitions Factory", Skarżysko-Kamienna)

The company was also one of the major investors in the Central Industrial Area. In 1937 it started building the State Munitions Factory No. 2 in Dąbrowa-Bór near Kraśnik and State Munitions Factory No. 5 in Jawidz near Lubartów. The construction was hampered by the outbreak of World War II.

Following the start of the war and the German occupation of Poland, most of the assets of PWU were confiscated by the Germans. The Polish government in exile "temporarily suspended" the Board of Directors of the PWU concern until the end of the war. In 1944 and 1945 most of the factories belonging to the PWU were completely destroyed. Some were later rebuilt, but the company itself was not reactivated after the war.
