= FŁT-Kraśnik =

FŁT-Kraśnik is a joint-stock company which belongs to the Polish Treasury. Its premises are located in Kraśnik, Poland, 50 km south-west of Lublin, near the eastern border of the European Union (EU). The main products of FŁT-Kraśnik are bearings and their components (products and semi-finished products after forging and pressing). FŁT-Kraśnik also manufactures grinding spindles, bearing repair kits, equipment, various tools and machines, and machine tool components along with their design documentation.

== History ==
FŁT-Kraśnik S.A. was founded in 1938 as Munition Factory number 2, as part of the Central Industrial District. The construction site was situated between the cities of Kraśnik and Urzędów, in a forest covering an area of more than 676 ha. Along with the construction of the factory, workers were recruited and a housing area for six thousand people was established. The housing settlement was named Dąbrowa-Bór. At the start of World War II, 39 housing blocks and six buildings for community use (among others: school, hospital, cinema) had already been completed.

Initially, the factory's production profile covered artillery munition (caliber 37 – 155 mm); the production of detonators was added before the start of the war.

During the war, technical crew and qualified workshop workers were relocated from factories in Radom, Skarżysko, and Warsaw, while laborers were sourced from local youth who were taken on as apprentices.

The first general manager of Munitions Factory number 2 was Professional Engineer Gutkowski and its technical director was Professional Engineer Gokieli.

=== Destructive effects of war ===
After the war began, construction work on both the factory and the living area was terminated. On 2 September 1939, the Luftwaffe damaged the railway, along with some production workshops. The occupation of Dąbrowa-Bór began on 15 September, and the factory was taken over by German military forces. The Polish crew managed to evacuate four batches of machines and devices, moving them to Krzemieniec, before the Germans arrived. Assets from Germany never came back.

During the occupation, the most valuable equipment was taken to Germany. Everything that remained was gathered in one workshop and used as equipment for the maintenance of military vehicles. The factory was also used to produce machine parts for Heinkel aircraft. Several of the workshops served as storage areas for emergency stocks of agricultural products and food and part of the factory and housing area was used as a concentration camp. The liberation of Dąbrowa-Bór took place on 27 July 1944.

=== First bearings from Poland ===
15 September 1948 marked the birthday of the Polish bearing industry with construction of a new facility at the site of Munitions Factory number 2. As a result of the great process of industrialization of the country, and by the decision of the central authorities, the metal products factory at Kraśnik was reopened and formed part of the Central Industrial District. It became the first bearing production facility in the history of Poland. At the same time, the city was being rebuilt to provide additional living space for employees and their families. Five years later, the city was renamed Kraśnik Fabryczny.

On 1 May 1949, the first batch (1000 pcs.) of 6204 bearings was manufactured. Since that time, the production of roller bearings has grown constantly. The demand for bearings on the domestic market and the possibility of export sales favoured the growth of the bearing industry in Poland.

== Significant events ==
1977-1981 - The aim of FŁT-Kraśnik was to build a central balls department. A 16-member crew visited the Japanese company AKS in Osaka for training and research. The knowledge gained there was used to launch the production of AKS ball bearings.

2 January 1985 - This date was beginning of further administrative-organizational evolution at FŁT, as it was converted from a state company to a joint stock company. The spin-off of several single companies from the whole enterprise resulted in increasing efficiency and more effective management. Constant modernization of the stock of machines, and improving the organization of work, gave a significant increase in efficiency and productivity. After privatization, a 2700-person crew at FŁT-Kraśnik S.A. is able to manufacture the same number of bearings as 8500 persons did in the earlier 1980s.

As a result of privatization, FŁT-Kraśnik S.A. has obtained customers world-wide and managed to increase the number of bearings delivered for OEM and Tier 1 production. Products from Kraśnik have found recipients in almost every European country, in North and South America, Asia and Africa. The expansion became possible by introducing a quality management system, in accordance with ISO/TS, and constant increases in product quality.

12 August 2002 - FŁT-Kraśnik S.A. began sold its newly founded sub-entity, Rolling Elements Workshop - Kraśnik Sp. Z o.o. (responsible for production of rolling elements and needle bearings), to a Japanese-American company, Tsubaki-Hoover.

8 December 2005 - FŁT-Kraśnik S.A. sold its Thermal-Electric Plant (responsible for generation of heat and electricity for the factory and the city) to Praterm Company.

2005 - Over the course of the year, FŁT-Kraśnik implemented an integrated Management System which included:

- A quality system (ISO/TS 16949 and ISO 9001 certificates);
- An environmental management system (ISO 14001 certificate); and
- An industrial health and safety management system (OHSAS 18001 and PN-N 18001 certificates).
