= Bogusław Oblewski =

Polish footballer

Personal information
- Date of birth: 11 October 1957 (age 69)
- Place of birth: Kraśnik, Poland
- Height: 1.83 m (6 ft 0 in)
- Position: Defender

Youth career
- 1966–1976: Stal Kraśnik

Senior career*
Years	Team	Apps	(Gls)
1976–1979	Stal Kraśnik		
1979–1980	Legia Warsaw	6	(1)
1980–1984	Lech Poznań	107	(9)
1984–1988	Lechia Gdańsk	97	(3)
1989	Stoczniowiec Gdańsk		
1989	Lechia Gdańsk	3	(0)
1989–90	Delsbo IF		
1991-92	Oxelösunds IK		(0)
1993–1996	Stomil Olsztyn	79	(0)
Total		289	(13)

Managerial career
- 1996–1998: Stomil Olsztyn
- 1998–1999: Pomezania Malbork
- 2000: Jeziorak Iława
- 2000–2001: Hutnik Nowa Huta
- 2001–2002: Okęcie Warsaw
- 2002–2004: Mazowsze Grójec
- 2004: Ruch Wysokie Mazowieckie
- 2005: Pomezania Malbork
- 2005: Narew Ostrołęka
- 2006–2008: Okęcie Warsaw
- 2008–2009: Hutnik Nowa Huta
- 2009–2010: Orkan Rumia
- 2010–2011: Okęcie Warsaw
- 2011–2012: AP Żyrardowianka Żyrardów
- * Club domestic league appearances and goals

Bogusław Oblewski (born 11 October 1957) is a Polish former footballer who played as a defender and later manager. His playing career was mostly spent in the top divisions of Poland, playing for some of Poland's biggest football clubs; Legia Warsaw, Lech Poznań and Lechia Gdańsk. His managerial career was mostly spent in the lower regional divisions in Poland.

== Playing career ==
=== Early years ===
Having been born in Kraśnik, Oblewski started playing football with his local team Stal Kraśnik at the age of 9. In his early years he was seen as a talent in the youth teams, receiving tutelage from Stal player Jan Błaszkiewicz. He played for three seasons with Stal, narrowly missing out on promotion via the playoffs in one season. In 1979 he was linked with a move to second division club Siarka Tarnobrzeg, but his call up to the army and subsequent move to Legia Warsaw put the move on hold. He spent 18 months in Warsaw, playing a total of 6 league games and scoring one goal. His main success with Legia was winning the Polish Cup in the 1979–80 season.

=== Lech Poznań ===
Oblewski moved to join Lech Poznań after his mandatory military service was completed. Despite playing his early years in a more defensive role his time with and after Lech was as a midfielder. His time at Lech proved to be very successful, playing over 100 league games for the club, and winning four competitions while with the club. With Lech he won the I liga in 1982–83, 1983–84 and the Polish Cup in 1982, 1984.

=== Lechia Gdańsk ===
He joined Lechia Gdańsk in 1984, making his debut against Ruch Chorzów in a 2-1 win. Oblewski played at least 20 times in the league for Lechia each season over the next four seasons. During his time with Lechia, they were consistent lower-mid table finishers. In the 1987–88 season Lechia were relegated from the I liga. In his final season of I liga football with Lechia he scored once and made 23 appearances.

=== Later years ===
Oblewski had a short spell with Stoczniowiec Gdańsk in 1989, before he returned to Lechia Gdańsk to make 5 appearances in the II liga and the II liga playoffs. Oblewski decided to move to abroad to play football to provide a better financial situation for his family, and so that his daughters had better living conditions. He moved to Sweden to play with Delsbo IF. He spent four seasons in Delsbo, becoming one of the first players from a communist country to move to Sweden for football. He returned to Poland for a short loan back to Lechia Gdańsk in 1990 where he played once in what was his final appearance for Lechia. In 1992 he returned to Poland where he played for Stomil Olsztyn. He joined Stomil while they played in the II liga, helping Stomil to I liga promotion in his second season by winning the league. For Stomil he played a further 29 games in the I liga over two seasons. In his final season Stomil finished 6th in the I liga, the club's highest position in their history. Oblewski retired from professional football in 1996.

== Managerial career ==
After his playing career, Oblewski held 14 different managerial jobs with 10 different clubs. He started his managerial career in 1996 with Stomil Olsztyn, his only management job in the top tier, before managing in the lower leagues with Pomezania Malbork (twice), Jeziorak Iława, Hutnik Nowa Huta (twice), Okęcie Warsaw (three times), Mazowsze Grójec, Ruch Wysokie Mazowieckie, Narew Ostrołęka, Orkan Rumia and Żyrardowianka Żyrardów. He retired from management in 2012 with his final job being with Żyrardowianka Żyrardów.

== Personal life ==
He was born in Kraśnik Fabryczny (later known as Kraśnik) on 11 October 1957, but moved to Bęczyn in February the following year. His parents are Stanisław Oblewski and Krystyna Oblewska. His father worked as a tailor, with his grandfather, Florian, being one of the many potters in Bęczyn. His uncle, Józef Oblewski, was a soldier in the home army during World War II. Shortly after WWII, he was killed by a group of sympathizers of the new Communist Government.

Oblewski married his wife Teresa on 20 October 1979. Together they have four daughters, Aleksandra, born in Poznań and Natalia, Lena and Wiktoria, all born in Gdańsk. He currently lives in Wrzeszcz, Gdańsk.

== Honours ==
Legia Warsaw

- Polish Cup: 1979–80

Lech Poznań

- Ekstraklasa: 1982–83, 1983–84
- Polish Cup: 1981–82, 1983–84

Stomil Olsztyn

- II liga, group II: 1993–94
