= Majdan Bobowski =

- Village
- Location within Poland
- Coordinates: 51°02′57″N 22°03′47″E
- Country: Poland
- Voivodeship: Lublin
- County: Kraśnik
- Gmina: Urzędów

Majdan Bobowski (Polish pronunciation: [ˈmajdan bɔˈbɔfskʲi]) is a village in the administrative district of Gmina Urzędów, within Kraśnik County, Lublin Voivodeship, in eastern Poland.
