= Okręglica-Kolonia =

Settlement in Poland

- Colony
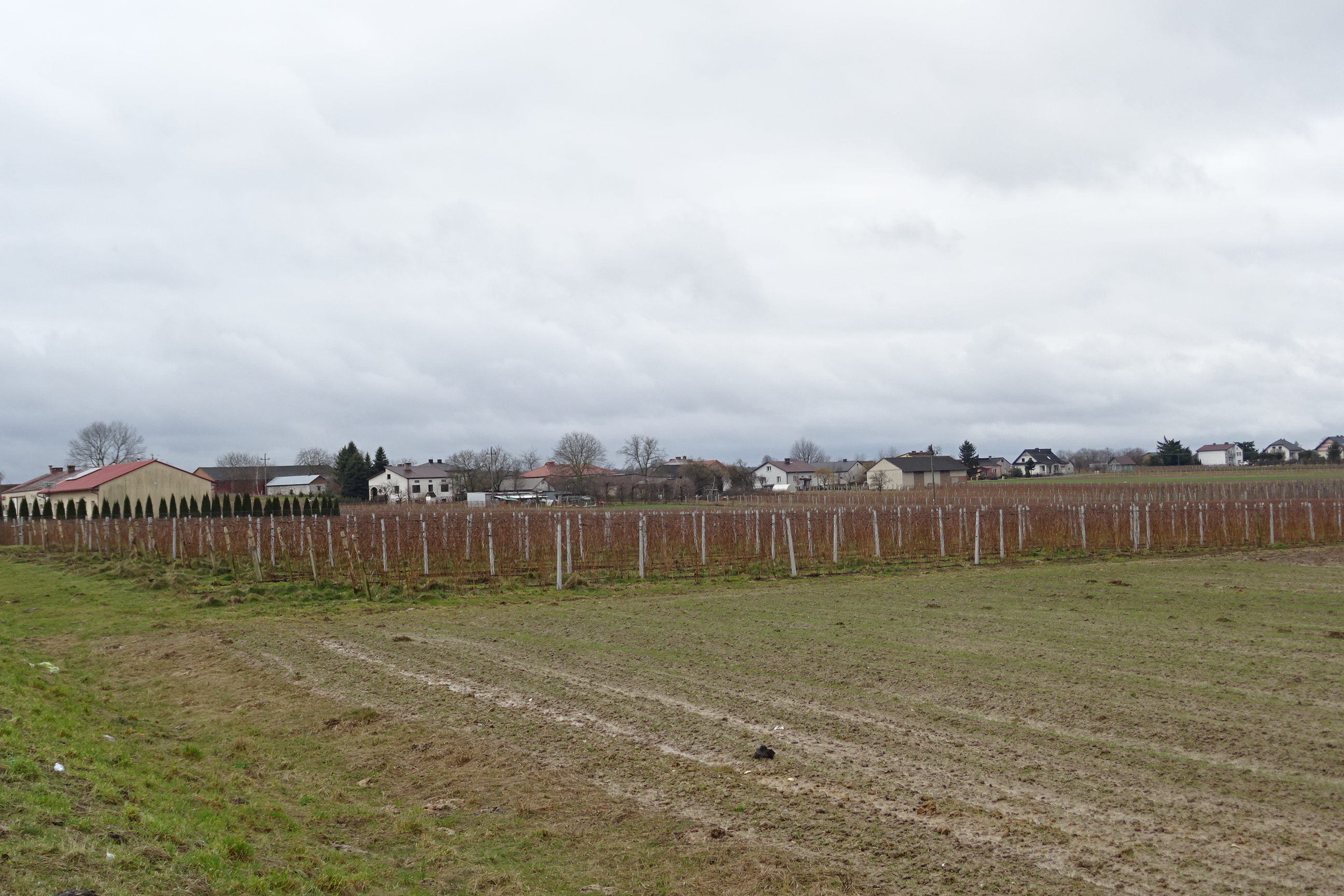

- Location within Poland
- Coordinates: 51°02′32″N 22°06′07″E
- Country: Poland
- Voivodeship: Lublin
- County: Kraśnik
- Gmina: Urzędów

Okręglica-Kolonia [ɔkrɛŋˈɡlit͡sa kɔˈlɔɲa] is a colony in the administrative district of Gmina Urzędów, within Kraśnik County, Lublin Voivodeship, in eastern Poland.
