= Gmina Wilkołaz =

Gmina Wilkołaz Wilkołaz Commune
- Gmina
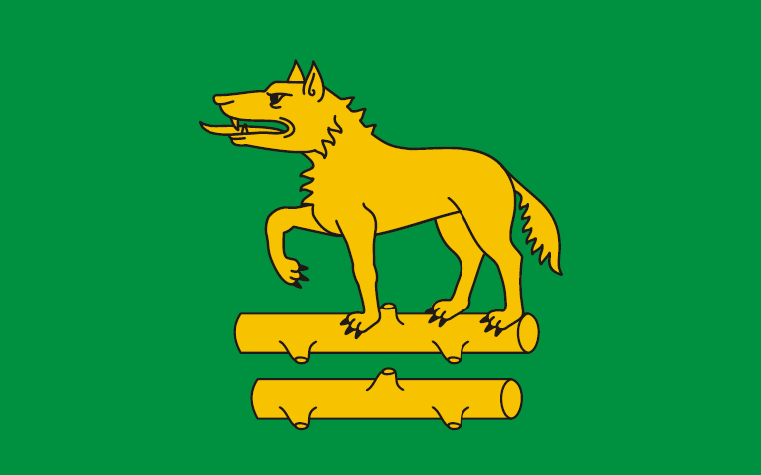
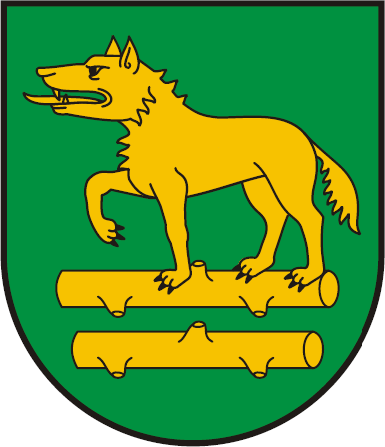
- Flag Coat of arms
- Interactive map of Gmina Wilkołaz
- Coordinates (Wilkołaz): 51°0′20″N 22°20′10″E
- Country: Poland
- Voivodeship: Lublin
- County: Kraśnik
- Seat: Wilkołaz

Area
  - Total: 81.86 km^{2} (31.61 sq mi)

Population (2013)
  - Total: 5,523
  - Density: 67.47/km^{2} (174.7/sq mi)
- Website: http://www.wilkolaz.lubelskie.pl/

Gmina Wilkołaz is a rural gmina (administrative district) in Kraśnik County, Lublin Voivodeship, in eastern Poland. Its seat is the village of Wilkołaz, which lies approximately 13 kilometres (8 mi) north-east of Kraśnik and 32 km (20 mi) south-west of the regional capital Lublin.

The gmina covers an area of 81.86 square kilometres (31.6 sq mi), and as of 2006 its total population is 5,554 (5,523 in 2013).

== Villages ==
Gmina Wilkołaz contains the villages and settlements of Ewunin, Marianówka, Obroki, Ostrów, Ostrów-Kolonia, Pułankowice, Rudnik, Rudnik-Kolonia, Wilkołaz, Wilkołaz Dolny, Wilkołaz Drugi, Wilkołaz Trzeci, Wólka Rudnicka, Zalesie and Zdrapy.

== Neighbouring gminas ==
Gmina Wilkołaz is bordered by the gminas of Borzechów, Kraśnik, Niedrzwica Duża, Strzyżewice, Urzędów and Zakrzówek.
