= Marianówka =

Marianówka may refer to the following villages in Poland:

- Marianówka, Lower Silesian Voivodeship (south-west Poland)
- Marianówka, Kraśnik County in Lublin Voivodeship (east Poland)
- Marianówka, Parczew County in Lublin Voivodeship (east Poland)
- Marianówka, now Marianivka (Volyn Oblast), in former south-eastern Poland (now western Ukraine)
