= Mikołajówka, Lublin Voivodeship =

Mikołajówka
- Village
- Location within Poland
- Coordinates: 51°0′N 22°3′E
- Country: Poland
- Voivodeship: Lublin
- County: Kraśnik
- Gmina: Urzędów

Mikołajówka [mikɔwaˈjufka] is a village in the administrative district of Gmina Urzędów, within Kraśnik County, Lublin Voivodeship, in eastern Poland.
