= Wilkołaz Drugi =

- Village
- Location within Poland
- Coordinates: 51°0′32″N 22°18′57″E
- Country: Poland
- Voivodeship: Lublin
- County: Kraśnik
- Gmina: Wilkołaz
- Population: 240

Wilkołaz Drugi [vilˈkɔwas ˈdruɡi] is a village in the administrative district of Gmina Wilkołaz, within Kraśnik County, Lublin Voivodeship, in eastern Poland.
