= Józefin, Gmina Urzędów =

Józefin
- Village
- Location within Poland
- Coordinates: 51°1′52″N 22°14′17″E
- Country: Poland
- Voivodeship: Lublin
- County: Kraśnik
- Gmina: Urzędów
- Population: 320

Józefin [juˈzɛfin] is a village in the administrative district of Gmina Urzędów, in Kraśnik County, Lublin Voivodeship, in eastern Poland.
