= Moniaki-Kolonia =

- Village
- Location within Poland
- Coordinates: 51°1′52″N 22°4′7″E
- Country: Poland
- Voivodeship: Lublin
- County: Kraśnik
- Gmina: Urzędów

Moniaki-Kolonia [mɔˈɲaki kɔˈlɔɲa] is a village in the administrative district of Gmina Urzędów, within Kraśnik County, Lublin Voivodeship, in eastern Poland.
