= Kajetanówka, Kraśnik County =

Kajetanówka
- Village
- Location within Poland
- Coordinates: 50°58′37″N 22°10′23″E
- Country: Poland
- Voivodeship: Lublin
- County: Kraśnik
- Gmina: Urzędów

Kajetanówka [kajɛtaˈnufka] is a village in the administrative district of Gmina Urzędów, within Kraśnik County, Lublin Voivodeship, in eastern Poland.
