= Gmina Kraśnik =

Gmina Kraśnik Kraśnik Commune
- Gmina
- Coat of arms
- Interactive map of Gmina Kraśnik
- Coordinates (Kraśnik): 50°55′N 22°13′E
- Country: Poland
- Voivodeship: Lublin
- County: Kraśnik
- Seat: Kraśnik

Area
  - Total: 105.36 km^{2} (40.68 sq mi)

Population (2013)
  - Total: 7,387
  - Density: 70.11/km^{2} (181.6/sq mi)
- Website: http://www.krasnik.woi.lublin.pl/

Gmina Kraśnik is a rural gmina (administrative district) in Kraśnik County, Lublin Voivodeship, in eastern Poland. Its seat is the town of Kraśnik, although the town is not part of the territory of the gmina.

The gmina covers an area of 105.36 square kilometres (40.68 sq mi), and as of 2006 its total population is 6,994 (7,387 in 2013).

== Villages ==
Gmina Kraśnik contains the villages and settlements of Dąbrowa-Bór, Karpiówka, Kowalin, Lasy, Mikulin, Pasieka, Pasieka-Kolonia, Podlesie, Słodków Drugi, Słodków Pierwszy, Słodków Trzeci, Spławy Drugie, Spławy Pierwsze, Stróża, Stróża-Kolonia and Suchynia.

== Neighbouring gminas ==
Gmina Kraśnik is bordered by the town of Kraśnik and by the gminas of Dzierzkowice, Szastarka, Trzydnik Duży, Urzędów, Wilkołaz and Zakrzówek.
