= Słodków Pierwszy =

- Village
- Location within Poland
- Coordinates: 50°54′N 22°16′E
- Country: Poland
- Voivodeship: Lublin
- County: Kraśnik
- Gmina: Kraśnik
- Population: 793

Słodków Pierwszy [ˈswɔtkuf ˈpjɛrfʂɨ] is a village in the administrative district of Gmina Kraśnik, within Kraśnik County, Lublin Voivodeship, in eastern Poland.

In 2006 the village had a population of 793.
