= Spławy Pierwsze =

- Village
- Location within Poland
- Coordinates: 50°54′48″N 22°11′6″E
- Country: Poland
- Voivodeship: Lublin
- County: Kraśnik
- Gmina: Kraśnik

Spławy Pierwsze [ˈspwavɨ ˈpjɛrfʂɛ] is a village in the administrative district of Gmina Kraśnik, within Kraśnik County, Lublin Voivodeship, in eastern Poland.
