= Gmina Urzędów =

Gmina Urzędów Urzędów Commune
- Gmina
- Coat of arms
- Interactive map of Gmina Urzędów
- Coordinates (Urzędów): 50°59′N 22°9′E
- Country: Poland
- Voivodeship: Lublin
- County: Kraśnik
- Seat: Urzędów

Area
  - Total: 119.06 km^{2} (45.97 sq mi)

Population (2013)
  - Total: 8,787
  - Density: 73.80/km^{2} (191.1/sq mi)
- Website: http://www.urzedow.pl

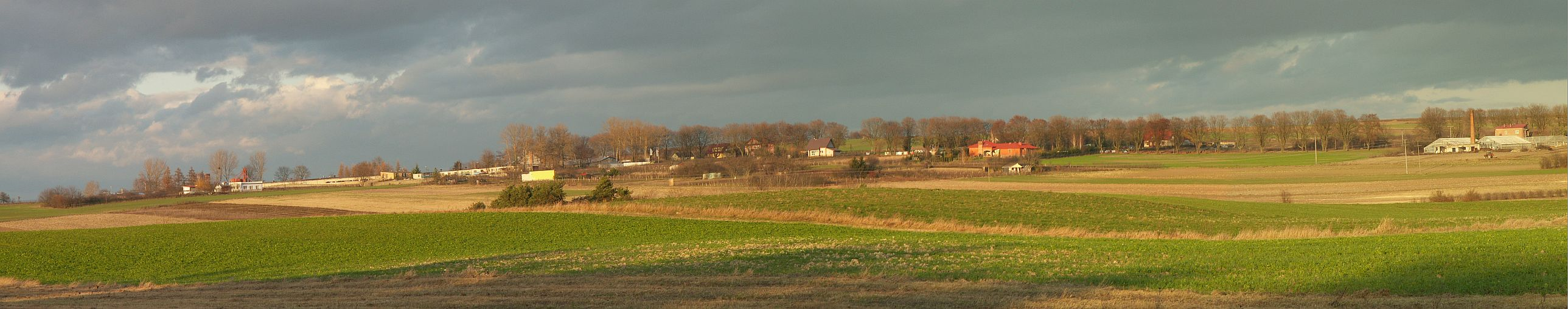
Panorama of the village of Urzędów

Gmina Urzędów is a rural gmina (administrative district) in Kraśnik County, Lublin Voivodeship, in eastern Poland. Its seat is the village of Urzędów, which lies approximately 9 kilometres (6 mi) north-west of Kraśnik and 42 km (26 mi) south-west of the regional capital Lublin.

The gmina covers an area of 119.06 square kilometres (46.0 sq mi), and as of 2006 its total population is 8,905 (8,787 in 2013).

== Villages ==
Gmina Urzędów contains the villages and settlements of Bęczyn, Boby-Kolonia, Boby-Księże, Boby-Wieś, Dębniak, Góry, Józefin, Kajetanówka, Konradów, Kozarów, Leśniczówka, Leszczyna, Majdan Bobowski, Majdan Moniacki, Metelin, Mikołajówka, Mikuszewskie, Moniaki, Moniaki-Kolonia, Natalin, Okręglica-Kolonia, Popkowice, Popkowice Księże, Rankowskie, Skorczyce, Urzędów, Wierzbica, Zadworze and Zakościelne.

== Neighbouring gminas ==
Gmina Urzędów is bordered by the town of Kraśnik and by the gminas of Borzechów, Chodel, Dzierzkowice, Józefów nad Wisłą, Kraśnik, Opole Lubelskie and Wilkołaz.
