= Wólka Rudnicka =

- Village
- Location within Poland
- Coordinates: 50°59′N 22°20′E
- Country: Poland
- Voivodeship: Lublin
- County: Kraśnik
- Gmina: Wilkołaz

Wólka Rudnicka [ˈvulka rudˈnit͡ska] is a village in the administrative district of Gmina Wilkołaz, within Kraśnik County, Lublin Voivodeship, in eastern Poland.
