= Dębina, Kraśnik County =

Dębina
- Village
- Location within Poland
- Coordinates: 50°59′14″N 21°58′37″E
- Country: Poland
- Voivodeship: Lublin
- County: Kraśnik
- Gmina: Dzierzkowice
- Time zone: UTC+1 (CET)
  - Summer (DST): UTC+2 (CEST)

Dębina [dɛmˈbina] is a village in the administrative district of Gmina Dzierzkowice, within Kraśnik County, Lublin Voivodeship, in eastern Poland.

== History ==
Seven Polish citizens were murdered by Nazi Germany in the village during World War II.
