= Popkowice =

- Village
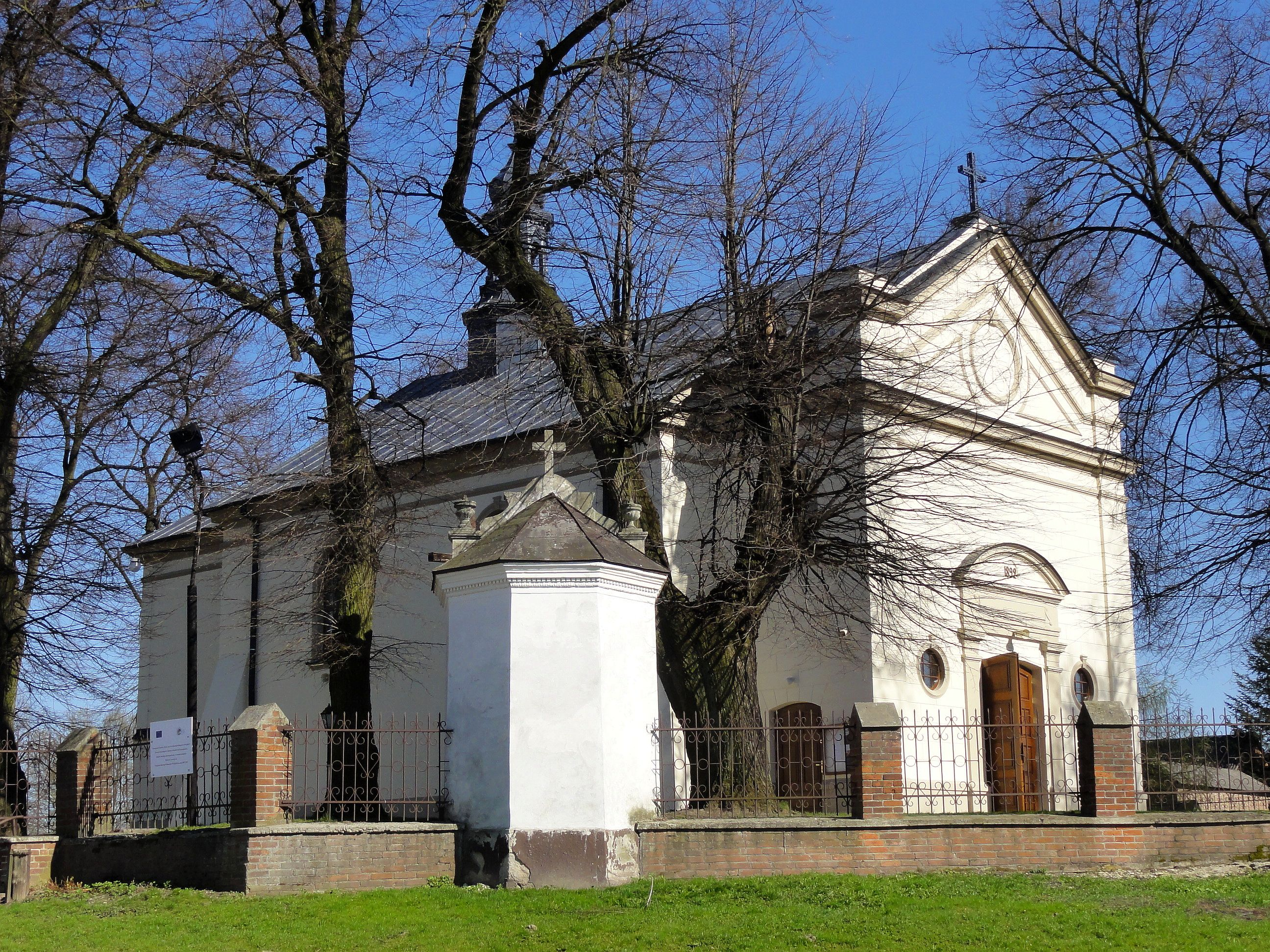
- Holy Trinity church in Popkowice

- Location within Poland
- Coordinates: 50°59′N 22°14′E
- Country: Poland
- Voivodeship: Lublin
- County: Kraśnik
- Gmina: Urzędów
- Time zone: UTC+1 (CET)
  - Summer (DST): UTC+2 (CEST)

Popkowice [pɔpkɔˈvit͡sɛ] is a village in the administrative district of Gmina Urzędów, in Kraśnik County, Lublin Voivodeship, in eastern Poland.

== History ==
15 Polish citizens were murdered by Nazi Germany in the village during World War II.
