= Ostrów, Kraśnik County =

Ostrów
- Village
- Location within Poland
- Coordinates: 50°59′47″N 22°16′8″E
- Country: Poland
- Voivodeship: Lublin
- County: Kraśnik
- Gmina: Wilkołaz
- Population: 390

Ostrów [ˈɔstruf] is a village in the administrative district of Gmina Wilkołaz, within Kraśnik County, Lublin Voivodeship, in eastern Poland.
