= Metelin =

Metelin may refer to:

- Metelin, Hrubieszów County
- Metelin, Kraśnik County

== People with the surname ==
- Johannes Metelin, printer associated with Heinrich Eggestein

== See also ==
- Mytilene
