= Terpentyna, Lublin Voivodeship =

Terpentyna
- Village
- Location within Poland
- Coordinates: 50°58′N 22°5′E
- Country: Poland
- Voivodeship: Lublin
- County: Kraśnik
- Gmina: Dzierzkowice

Terpentyna [tɛrpɛnˈtɨna] is a village in the administrative district of Gmina Dzierzkowice, within Kraśnik County, Lublin Voivodeship, in eastern Poland. Terpentyna contains the gmina offices, although the designated seat (siedziba) of the gmina is Dzierzkowice, a location of which Terpentyna is now officially part.
