= Pułankowice =

- Village
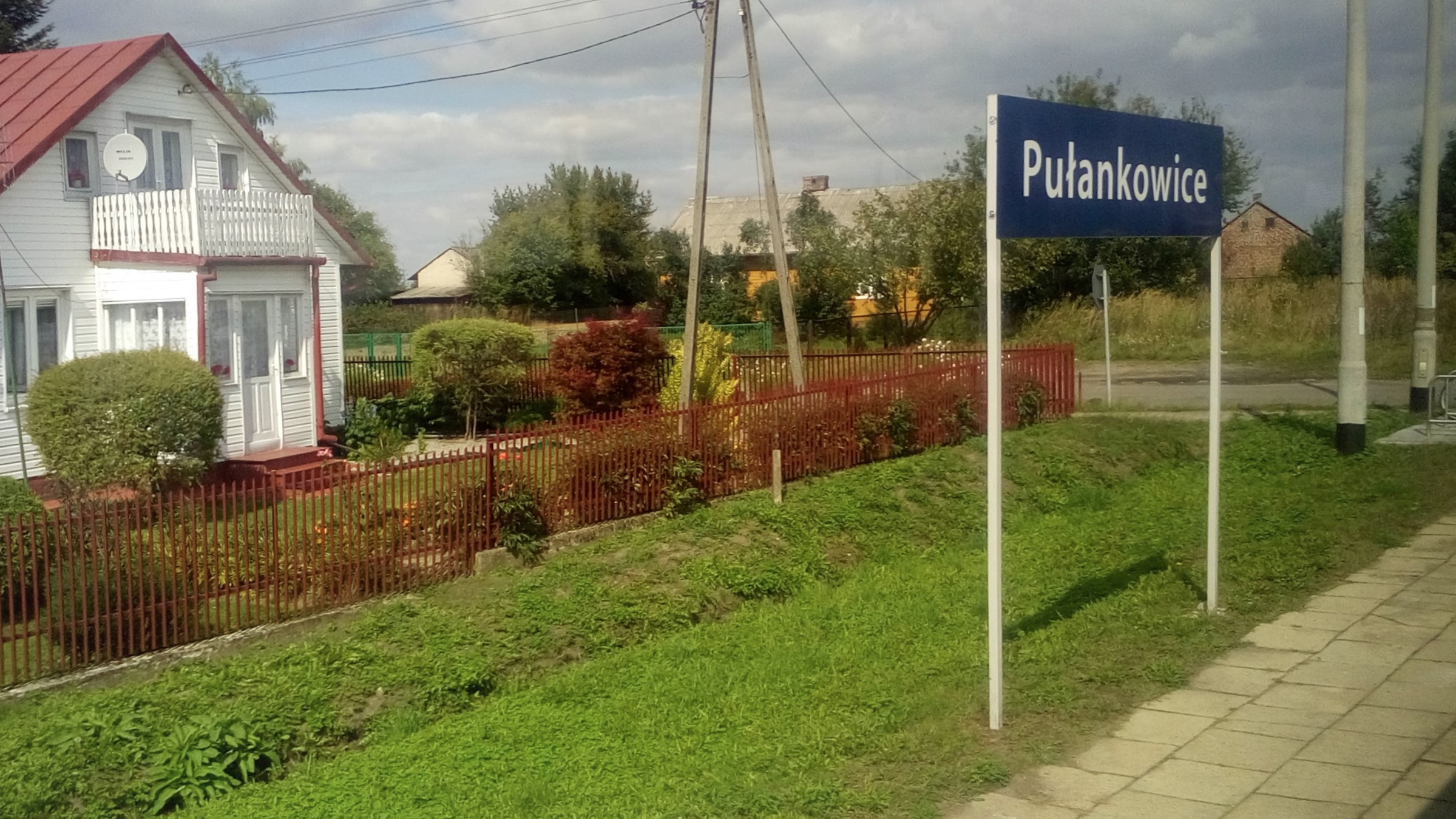
- Pułankowice train stop

- Location within Poland
- Coordinates: 50°58′N 22°19′E
- Country: Poland
- Voivodeship: Lublin
- County: Kraśnik
- Gmina: Wilkołaz
- Time zone: UTC+1 (CET)
  - Summer (DST): UTC+2 (CEST)

Pułankowice [puwaŋkɔˈvit͡sɛ] is a village in the administrative district of Gmina Wilkołaz, within Kraśnik County, Lublin Voivodeship, in eastern Poland.

== History ==
Five Polish citizens were murdered by Nazi Germany in the village during World War II.
