= Wierzbica, Kraśnik County =

Wierzbica
- Village
- Location within Poland
- Coordinates: 51°1′31″N 22°6′37″E
- Country: Poland
- Voivodeship: Lublin
- County: Kraśnik
- Gmina: Urzędów
- Population: 650

Wierzbica [vjɛʐˈbit͡sa] is a village in the administrative district of Gmina Urzędów, within Kraśnik County, Lublin Voivodeship, in eastern Poland.
