= Ostrów-Kolonia, Kraśnik County =

Ostrów-Kolonia
- Village
- Location within Poland
- Coordinates: 50°58′45″N 22°16′53″E
- Country: Poland
- Voivodeship: Lublin
- County: Kraśnik
- Gmina: Wilkołaz
- Population: 420

Ostrów-Kolonia [ˈɔstruf kɔˈlɔɲa] is a village in the administrative district of Gmina Wilkołaz, within Kraśnik County, Lublin Voivodeship, in eastern Poland.
