= Stróża, Lublin Voivodeship =

Stróża
- Village
- Location within Poland
- Coordinates: 50°54′N 22°16′E
- Country: Poland
- Voivodeship: Lublin
- County: Kraśnik
- Gmina: Kraśnik

Population
  - Total: 742
- Time zone: UTC+1 (CET)
  - Summer (DST): UTC+2 (CEST)

Stróża [ˈstruʐa] is a village in the administrative district of Gmina Kraśnik, within Kraśnik County, Lublin Voivodeship, in eastern Poland.

In 2006 the village had a population of 742.

== History ==
11 Polish citizens were murdered by Nazi Germany in the village during World War II.
