= Wyżnica-Kolonia =

- Village
- Location within Poland
- Coordinates: 50°56′10″N 22°10′11″E
- Country: Poland
- Voivodeship: Lublin
- County: Kraśnik
- Gmina: Dzierzkowice

Wyżnica-Kolonia [vɨʐˈnit͡sa kɔˈlɔɲa] is a village in the administrative district of Gmina Dzierzkowice, within Kraśnik County, Lublin Voivodeship, in eastern Poland.
