= Pasieka, Kraśnik County =

Village in Lublin Voivodeship, Poland

Pasieka
- Village
- Location within Poland
- Coordinates: 50°55′N 22°14′E
- Country: Poland
- Voivodeship: Lublin Voivodeship
- County: Kraśnik
- Gmina: Kraśnik

Pasieka [paˈɕɛka] is a village in the administrative district of Gmina Kraśnik, within Kraśnik County, Lublin Voivodeship, in eastern Poland.
