= Zalesie, Kraśnik County =

Zalesie
- Village
- Location within Poland
- Coordinates: 51°1′N 22°17′E
- Country: Poland
- Voivodeship: Lublin
- County: Kraśnik
- Gmina: Wilkołaz

Zalesie [zaˈlɛɕɛ] is a village in the administrative district of Gmina Wilkołaz, within Kraśnik County, Lublin Voivodeship, in eastern Poland.
