= Karpiówka =

- Village
- Location within Poland
- Coordinates: 50°53′N 22°19′E
- Country: Poland
- Voivodeship: Lublin
- County: Kraśnik
- Gmina: Kraśnik
- Population: 435

Karpiówka [karˈpjufka] is a village in the administrative district of Gmina Kraśnik, within Kraśnik County, Lublin Voivodeship, in eastern Poland.

In 2007 the village had a population of 435.
