= Góry, Gmina Urzędów =

Góry
- Village
- Location within Poland
- Coordinates: 51°00′13″N 22°10′07″E
- Country: Poland
- Voivodeship: Lublin
- County: Kraśnik
- Gmina: Urzędów

Góry [ˈɡurɨ] is a village in the administrative district of Gmina Urzędów, within Kraśnik County, Lublin Voivodeship, in eastern Poland.
