= Majdan Moniacki =

- Village
- Location within Poland
- Coordinates: 51°02′25″N 22°04′24″E
- Country: Poland
- Voivodeship: Lublin
- County: Kraśnik
- Gmina: Urzędów

Majdan Moniacki (Polish pronunciation: [ˈmajdan mɔˈɲatskʲi]) is a village in the administrative district of Gmina Urzędów, within Kraśnik County, Lublin Voivodeship, in eastern Poland.
