= Kozarów =

- Village
- Location within Poland
- Coordinates: 51°02′01″N 22°03′01″E
- Country: Poland
- Voivodeship: Lublin
- County: Kraśnik
- Gmina: Urzędów

Kozarów [kɔˈzaruf] is a village in the administrative district of Gmina Urzędów, within Kraśnik County, Lublin Voivodeship, in eastern Poland.
