= Obroki =

- Village
- Location within Poland
- Coordinates: 51°01′54″N 22°22′11″E
- Country: Poland
- Voivodeship: Lublin
- County: Kraśnik
- Gmina: Wilkołaz
- Elevation: 247 m (810 ft)

Obroki [ɔˈbrɔki] is a village in the administrative district of Gmina Wilkołaz, within Kraśnik County, Lublin Voivodeship, in eastern Poland.
