= Konradów, Lublin Voivodeship =

Konradów
- Village
- Location within Poland
- Coordinates: 51°2′43″N 22°2′45″E
- Country: Poland
- Voivodeship: Lublin
- County: Kraśnik
- Gmina: Urzędów

Konradów [kɔnˈraduf] is a village in the administrative district of Gmina Urzędów, within Kraśnik County, Lublin Voivodeship, in eastern Poland.
