= Wyżnianka-Kolonia =

- Village
- Location within Poland
- Coordinates: 50°57′2″N 22°8′26″E
- Country: Poland
- Voivodeship: Lublin
- County: Kraśnik
- Gmina: Dzierzkowice

Wyżnianka-Kolonia [vɨʐˈɲaŋka kɔˈlɔɲa] is a village in the administrative district of Gmina Dzierzkowice, within Kraśnik County, Lublin Voivodeship, in eastern Poland.
