= Moniaki =

- Village
- Location within Poland
- Coordinates: 51°1′N 22°6′E
- Country: Poland
- Voivodeship: Lublin
- County: Kraśnik
- Gmina: Urzędów

Moniaki [mɔˈɲaki] is a village in the administrative district of Gmina Urzędów, within Kraśnik County, Lublin Voivodeship, in eastern Poland.
