= Mikulin, Kraśnik County =

Mikulin
- Village
- Location within Poland
- Coordinates: 50°53′N 22°10′E
- Country: Poland
- Voivodeship: Lublin
- County: Kraśnik
- Gmina: Kraśnik

Mikulin [miˈkulin] is a village in the administrative district of Gmina Kraśnik, within Kraśnik County, Lublin Voivodeship, in eastern Poland.
