= Spławy Drugie =

- Village
- Location within Poland
- Coordinates: 50°54′42″N 22°9′8″E
- Country: Poland
- Voivodeship: Lublin
- County: Kraśnik
- Gmina: Kraśnik

Spławy Drugie [ˈspwavɨ ˈdruɡʲɛ] is a village in the administrative district of Gmina Kraśnik, within Kraśnik County, Lublin Voivodeship, in eastern Poland.
