= Kowalin =

- Village
- Location within Poland
- Coordinates: 50°54′N 22°9′E
- Country: Poland
- Voivodeship: Lublin
- County: Kraśnik
- Gmina: Kraśnik

Population (approx.)
  - Total: 320
- Time zone: UTC+1 (CET)
  - Summer (DST): UTC+2 (CEST)

Kowalin [kɔˈvalin] is a village in the administrative district of Gmina Kraśnik, within Kraśnik County, Lublin Voivodeship, in eastern Poland.

== History ==
12 Polish citizens were murdered by Nazi Germany in the village during World War II.
