= Skorczyce =

- Village
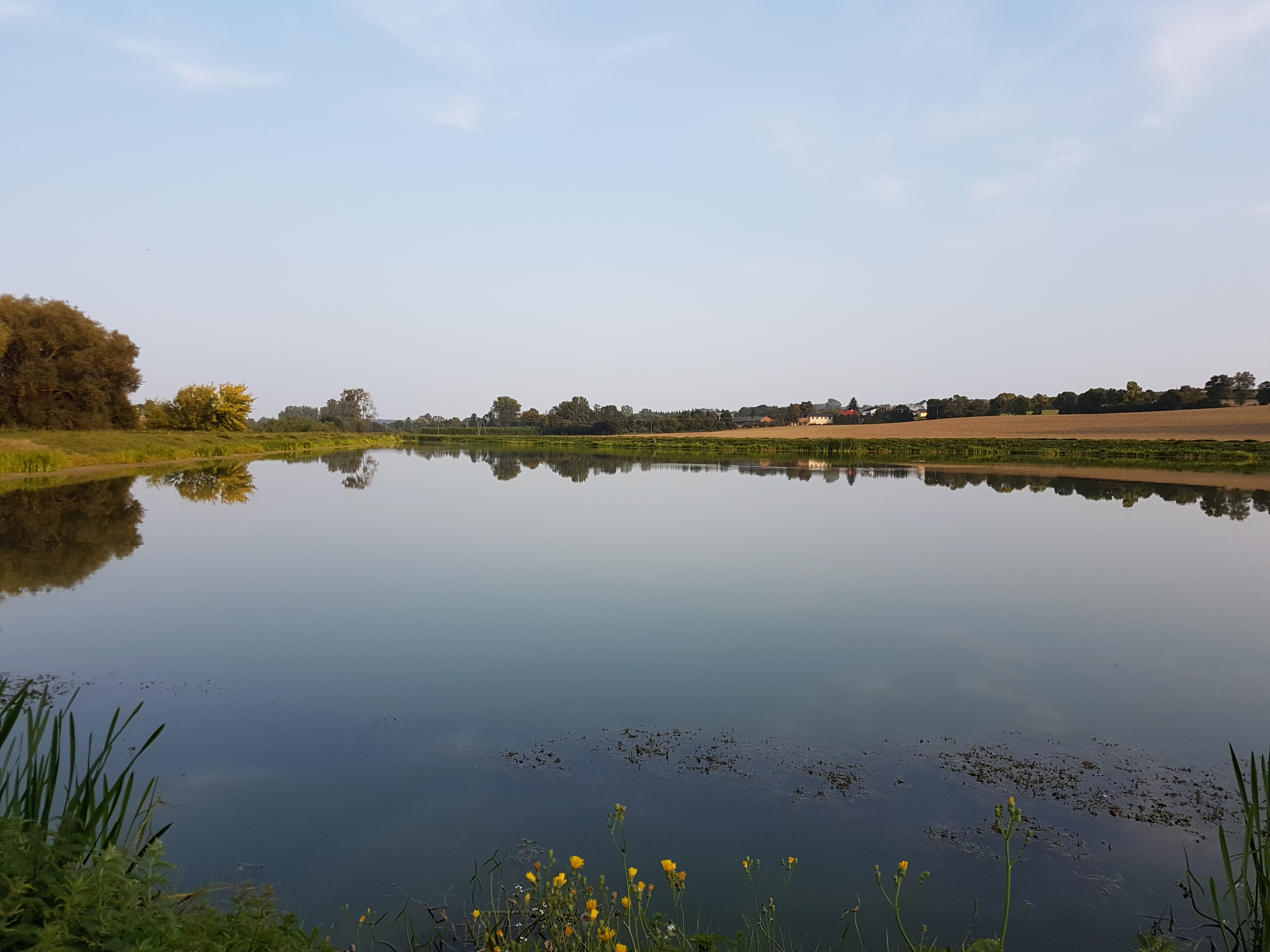
- Artificial lake in Skorczyce

- Location within Poland
- Coordinates: 51°1′N 22°12′E
- Country: Poland
- Voivodeship: Lublin
- County: Kraśnik
- Gmina: Urzędów

Skorczyce [skɔrˈt͡ʂɨt͡sɛ] is a village in the administrative district of Gmina Urzędów, in Kraśnik County, Lublin Voivodeship, in eastern Poland.
