= Lasy, Lublin Voivodeship =

Lasy
- Village
- Location within Poland
- Coordinates: 50°56′02″N 22°15′37″E
- Country: Poland
- Voivodeship: Lublin
- County: Kraśnik
- Gmina: Kraśnik

Lasy [ˈlasɨ] is a village in the administrative district of Gmina Kraśnik, within Kraśnik County, Lublin Voivodeship, in eastern Poland.
