= Natalin, Gmina Urzędów =

Natalin
- Village
- Location within Poland
- Coordinates: 51°00′25″N 22°04′16″E
- Country: Poland
- Voivodeship: Lublin
- County: Kraśnik
- Gmina: Urzędów
- Time zone: UTC+1 (CET)
  - Summer (DST): UTC+2 (CEST)

Natalin [naˈtalin] is a village in the administrative district of Gmina Urzędów, within Kraśnik County, Lublin Voivodeship, in eastern Poland.

== History ==
Two Polish citizens were murdered by Nazi Germany in the village during World War II.
