= Podlesie, Kraśnik County =

Podlesie
- Village
- Location within Poland
- Coordinates: 50°55′N 22°13′E
- Country: Poland
- Voivodeship: Lublin
- County: Kraśnik
- Gmina: Kraśnik

Podlesie [pɔdˈlɛɕɛ] is a village in the administrative district of Gmina Kraśnik, within Kraśnik County, Lublin Voivodeship, in eastern Poland.
