= Popkowice Księże =

- Village
- Location within Poland
- Coordinates: 50°58′52″N 22°14′47″E
- Country: Poland
- Voivodeship: Lublin
- County: Kraśnik
- Gmina: Urzędów

Popkowice Księże [pɔpkɔˈvit͡sɛ ˈkɕɛ̃ʐɛ] is a village in the administrative district of Gmina Urzędów, within Kraśnik County, Lublin Voivodeship, in eastern Poland.
