= Rudnik-Kolonia =

- Village
- Location within Poland
- Coordinates: 50°58′11″N 22°18′15″E
- Country: Poland
- Voivodeship: Lublin
- County: Kraśnik
- Gmina: Wilkołaz
- Population: 330

Rudnik-Kolonia (Polish pronunciation: [ˈrudɲik kɔˈlɔɲa]) is a village in the administrative district of Gmina Wilkołaz, within Kraśnik County, Lublin Voivodeship, in eastern Poland.
