= Leśniczówka, Kraśnik County =

Leśniczówka
- Village
- Location within Poland
- Coordinates: 50°58′50″N 22°14′16″E
- Country: Poland
- Voivodeship: Lublin
- County: Kraśnik
- Gmina: Urzędów

Leśniczówka (Polish pronunciation: [lɛɕɲiˈtʂufka]) is a village in the administrative district of Gmina Urzędów, within Kraśnik County, Lublin Voivodeship, in eastern Poland.
