= Krzywie =

Krzywie may refer to:

- Krzywie, Lublin Voivodeship, Poland
- Krzywie, Masovian Voivodeship, Poland
