= Dębniak, Kraśnik County =

Dębniak
- Village
- Location within Poland
- Coordinates: 50°59′16″N 22°06′57″E
- Country: Poland
- Voivodeship: Lublin
- County: Kraśnik
- Gmina: Urzędów

Dębniak [ˈdɛmbɲak] is a village in the administrative district of Gmina Urzędów, within Kraśnik County, Lublin Voivodeship, in eastern Poland.
