= Ewunin =

- Village
- Location within Poland
- Coordinates: 51°2′N 22°16′E
- Country: Poland
- Voivodeship: Lublin
- County: Kraśnik
- Gmina: Wilkołaz

Ewunin [ɛˈvunin] is a village in the administrative district of Gmina Wilkołaz, within Kraśnik County, Lublin Voivodeship, in eastern Poland.
