= Zdrapy, Kraśnik County =

Zdrapy
- Village
- Location within Poland
- Coordinates: 50°59′N 22°21′E
- Country: Poland
- Voivodeship: Lublin
- County: Kraśnik
- Gmina: Wilkołaz

Zdrapy [ˈzdrapɨ] is a village in the administrative district of Gmina Wilkołaz, within Kraśnik County, Lublin Voivodeship, in eastern Poland.
