= Dzierzkowice-Góry =

- Village
- Location within Poland
- Coordinates: 50°56′53″N 22°5′23″E
- Country: Poland
- Voivodeship: Lublin
- County: Kraśnik
- Gmina: Dzierzkowice

Dzierzkowice-Góry [d͡ʑɛʂkɔˈvit͡sɛ ˈɡurɨ] is a village in the administrative district of Gmina Dzierzkowice, within Kraśnik County, Lublin Voivodeship, in eastern Poland.
