= Boby Techi =

- Born: 9 January 1990 (age 36); Itanagar, India
- Origin: Arunachal Pradesh, India
- Genres: Indie Pop-Folk
- Occupations: Singer, songwriter
- Instruments: Vocals, guitar
- Years active: 2013–present

Boby Techi (Hindi: बोबी तेची) (born 9 January 1990) is an Indian indie pop-folk singer-songwriter. At the K-Pop India Contest 2013, she was awarded LG SONGSTAR of the year. As a singer, Techi has formerly collaborated with The Vinyl Records as the lead vocalist. Aside from her musical career, Techi has also branched out into acting. She made her film debut Stranger in My Land in 2014.

== Early life ==
Boby Techi was born on 9 January 1990 in Itanagar, Arunachal Pradesh, India, the daughter of an Engineer. She is the second of five children. Techi was born to Donyi-Polo Family. She grew up in Arunachal Pradesh, where she studied in Donyi Polo Vidya Bhawan, and entered various talent competitions. The first song she performed on stage was 'Cry' by Mandy Moore. Techi has cited Sharon Van Etten, Mindy Gledhill, Megan Washington, Stars, Daughter, etc. as a major influence in regard to her love and passion for music. Boby Techi earned a university degree from the Gargi College, University of Delhi.

== K-Pop India ==
Boby Techi was the Winner of LG SONGSTAR of the year 2013. K-pop India is an adaptation of the Pop music format originating in South Korea that is characterized by a wide variety of pop-music elements aim to promote Korean culture and facilitate cultural exchanges in India.

Week	Theme	Song choice	Original artist	Result
Final	K-pop cover Song	"What Should I do"	Ji Sun	Winner

- ^1 Performances and Results.
- ^2 Techi was among the Top 6, and declared LG Songstar of the year.

== Tours ==
Prior to winning the K-Pop India Contest, Techi toured with the Korean pop-rock band BIURET on their maiden visit to India. While on Tour, her appearances at Music festivals including the performance at Kohima Hornbill Festival and Imphal Indo-Korean music festival was received positively.

== Career ==
Apart from singing, Techi made her minor role debut in the 2014 film Stranger in My Land. Her debut single 'Only you', was released on 27 May 2014. Indihut describes her debut single as "A song which gives you a rush of bliss and bubbles popping in your hearts". Her second single 'Black and White' was released on 27 February 2015. Boby will also be making her feature film debut with Orunasol Man, a superhero action thriller in 2017.

== Personal life ==
Techi was the lead vocalist of India-based all-girl rock band The Vinyl Records. However, she had to opt out of the band because of personal reasons. She still maintains good relations with the band.

== Discography ==
=== Singles ===
Year	Title	Album
2014	Only You	Boby Techi
2015	Black and White	Boby Techi

=== Filmography ===
Film
Year	Title	Role	Notes
2014	Stranger in My Land	Mizo Girl	Cameo Role

Feature Film
Year	Title	Role	Notes
2017	Orunasol Man	Togam	Lead Role
