= Dzierzkowice-Rynek =

- Village
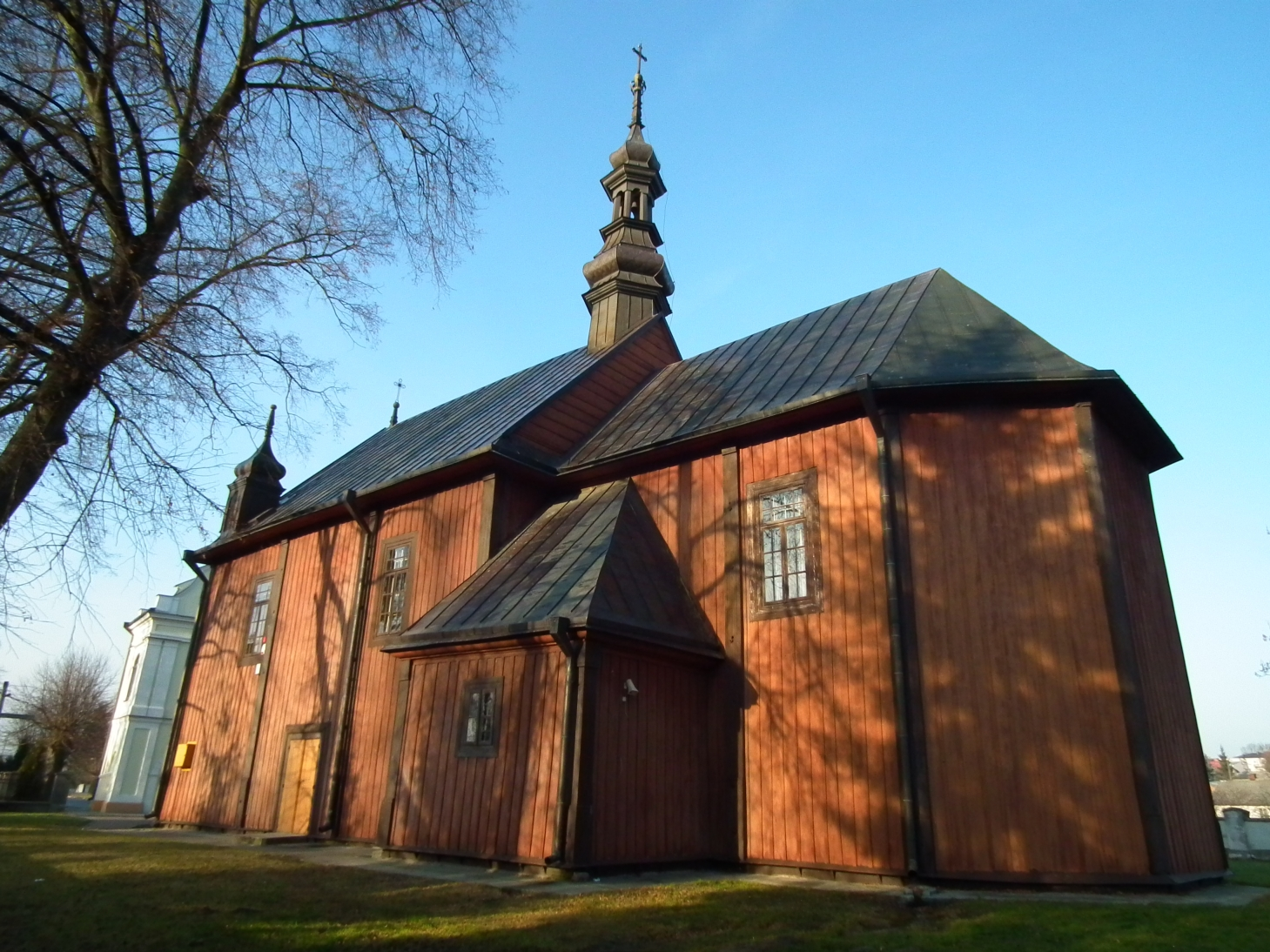
- Church of Saints Stanislaus and Mary Magdalene

- Location within Poland
- Coordinates: 50°57′29″N 22°5′42″E
- Country: Poland
- Voivodeship: Lublin
- County: Kraśnik
- Gmina: Dzierzkowice

Dzierzkowice-Rynek [d͡ʑɛʂkɔˈvit͡sɛ ˈrɨnɛk] is a village in the administrative district of Gmina Dzierzkowice, within Kraśnik County, Lublin Voivodeship, in eastern Poland.
