= Dzierzkowice-Podwody =

- Village
- Location within Poland
- Coordinates: 50°56′43″N 22°6′39″E
- Country: Poland
- Voivodeship: Lublin
- County: Kraśnik
- Gmina: Dzierzkowice
- Time zone: UTC+1 (CET)
  - Summer (DST): UTC+2 (CEST)

Dzierzkowice-Podwody [d͡ʑɛʂkɔˈvit͡sɛ pɔdˈvɔdɨ] is a village in the administrative district of Gmina Dzierzkowice, within Kraśnik County, Lublin Voivodeship, in eastern Poland.

== History ==
13 Polish citizens were murdered by Nazi Germany in the village during World War II.
