= Wilkołaz =

- Village
- Location within Poland
- Coordinates: 51°0′20″N 22°20′10″E
- Country: Poland
- Voivodeship: Lublin
- County: Kraśnik
- Gmina: Wilkołaz
- Website: http://www.wilkolaz.ug.gov.pl/

Wilkołaz [vilˈkɔwas] is a village in Kraśnik County, Lublin Voivodeship, in eastern Poland. It is the seat of the gmina (administrative district) called Gmina Wilkołaz.
