= Krzywie, Lublin Voivodeship =

Krzywie
- Village
- Location within Poland
- Coordinates: 50°57′N 22°7′E
- Country: Poland
- Voivodeship: Lublin
- County: Kraśnik
- Gmina: Dzierzkowice

Krzywie [ˈkʂɨvjɛ] is a village in the administrative district of Gmina Dzierzkowice, within Kraśnik County, Lublin Voivodeship, in eastern Poland.
