= Metelin, Kraśnik County =

Metelin
- Village
- Location within Poland
- Coordinates: 51°02′19″N 22°02′38″E
- Country: Poland
- Voivodeship: Lublin
- County: Kraśnik
- Gmina: Urzędów

Metelin [mɛˈtɛlin] is a village in the administrative district of Gmina Urzędów, within Kraśnik County, Lublin Voivodeship, in eastern Poland.
