= Dzierzkowice-Wola =

- Village
- Location within Poland
- Coordinates: 50°58′31″N 22°2′38″E
- Country: Poland
- Voivodeship: Lublin
- County: Kraśnik
- Gmina: Dzierzkowice

Dzierzkowice-Wola [d͡ʑɛʂkɔˈvit͡sɛ ˈvɔla] is a village in the administrative district of Gmina Dzierzkowice, within Kraśnik County, Lublin Voivodeship, in eastern Poland.
