= Bęczyn, Lublin Voivodeship =

Bęczyn
- Village
- Location within Poland
- Coordinates: 50°59′N 22°8′E
- Country: Poland
- Voivodeship: Lublin
- County: Kraśnik
- Gmina: Urzędów

Bęczyn [ˈbɛnt͡ʂɨn] is a village in the administrative district of Gmina Urzędów, within Kraśnik County, Lublin Voivodeship, in eastern Poland.
