= Arambam Boby =

Indian bodybuilder

- professional bodybuilder

Personal info
- Nickname: Boby
- Born: 1 February 1975 (age 50); Manipur, India

Best statistics
- Height: 165 cm (5 ft 5 in)
- Weight: 80 kg (176 lb)

Professional (Pro) career
- Pro-debut: Jr. Mr. Manipur -1995, Champion of the Champions; Sr. Mr. India 1998
- Best win: Eight times World Champion, 2010, 2011, 2012, 2013, 2014, 2015, 2016, 2017, 2018(7Gold, 1 silver, 1 Bronze)

Arambam Boby is an Indian bodybuilder from Manipur, India, who won his first Mr. World title in the year 2010 in the 75 kg category for the Bodybuilding Championship in Varanasi, India; since then, he has been continuously representing India. Arambam also won 3 Mr. South Asia titles, 5 Mr. Asia titles, 8 Mr. World titles and 12 Mr. India titles

== Early life and education ==
Boby was born on February 1, 1975, in Manipur, to a Meitei family, late Mr. Arambam Ibomcha Singh and Mrs. Arambam Ongbi Dashumati Devi. He lost his father at the age of 2. He was able to complete his education up to Matriculation only because of family circumstances. He joined the Sports Authority of India (SAI) located at Langol as a gymnast in 1989. He joined Sashastra Seema Bal (SSB) in 1993 as a constable under their sports promotion program and shifted his discipline to athletics and became a sprinter in 100 and 200 meters. He is a Hindu.

== Career as bodybuilder ==
In the year 1995, Bobby started his new career as a bodybuilder. In 1996, he won the Mr. Manipur Junior (Overall Title) and Mr. Manipur Senior (Overall Title). In the same year, he represented India in the Jr. Asian Bodybuilding Championship held in Delhi. He received an offer from the Indian Railways in the year 1997 to join them which he accepted; he then won the title of Mr. India in 1998 and Mister World in 2010.

Arambam has now started his own gym on Imphal to train the aspiring athletes of the state and has conducted the 1st Boby Classic 2021 at Manipur University Centenary Hall.
