= Dzierzkowice-Zastawie =

- Village
- Location within Poland
- Coordinates: 50°57′56″N 22°3′34″E
- Country: Poland
- Voivodeship: Lublin
- County: Kraśnik
- Gmina: Dzierzkowice

Dzierzkowice-Zastawie [d͡ʑɛʂkɔˈvit͡sɛ zasˈtavjɛ] is a village in the administrative district of Gmina Dzierzkowice, within Kraśnik County, Lublin Voivodeship, in eastern Poland.
