= Gmina Dzierzkowice =

Gmina in Lublin Voivodeship, Poland

Gmina Dzierzkowice Dzierzkowice Commune
- Gmina
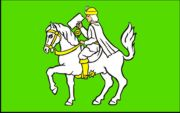
- Flag Coat of arms
- Interactive map of Gmina Dzierzkowice
- Coordinates (Terpentyna): 50°58′N 22°5′E
- Country: Poland
- Voivodeship: Lublin
- County: Kraśnik

Area
  - Total: 86.81 km^{2} (33.52 sq mi)

Population (2013)
  - Total: 5,414
  - Density: 62.37/km^{2} (161.5/sq mi)
- Website: http://www.dzierzkowice.pl//

Gmina Dzierzkowice is a rural gmina (administrative district) in Kraśnik County, Lublin Voivodeship, in eastern Poland. Its seat is Dzierzkowice, a location which is divided into several sołectwos. The offices of the gmina are in fact in Terpentyna, which lies approximately 11 kilometres (7 mi) north-west of Kraśnik and 47 km (29 mi) south-west of the regional capital Lublin.

The gmina covers an area of 86.81 square kilometres (33.5 sq mi), and as of 2006 its total population is 5,401 (5,414 in 2013).

== Villages ==
Gmina Dzierzkowice contains the villages and settlements of Dębina, Dzierzkowice-Góry, Dzierzkowice-Podwody, Dzierzkowice-Rynek, Dzierzkowice-Wola, Dzierzkowice-Zastawie, Krzywie, Ludmiłówka, Sosnowa Wola, Terpentyna, Wyżnianka, Wyżnianka-Kolonia, Wyżnica and Wyżnica-Kolonia.

== Neighbouring gminas ==
Gmina Dzierzkowice is bordered by the town of Kraśnik and by the gminas of Annopol, Gościeradów, Józefów nad Wisłą, Kraśnik, Trzydnik Duży and Urzędów.
