= Marianówka, Kraśnik County =

Marianówka
- Village
- Location within Poland
- Coordinates: 51°3′N 22°20′E
- Country: Poland
- Voivodeship: Lublin
- County: Kraśnik
- Gmina: Wilkołaz

Marianówka [marjaˈnufka] is a village in the administrative district of Gmina Wilkołaz, within Kraśnik County, Lublin Voivodeship, in eastern Poland.
