= Boby-Kolonia =

- Village
- Location within Poland
- Coordinates: 51°1′39″N 22°2′48″E
- Country: Poland
- Voivodeship: Lublin
- County: Kraśnik
- Gmina: Urzędów

Boby-Kolonia [ˈbɔbɨ kɔˈlɔɲa] is a village in the administrative district of Gmina Urzędów, within Kraśnik County, Lublin Voivodeship, in eastern Poland. It has a population of 188 people.
