= Stranger in My Land =

- Official Poster
- Directed by: Duyu Tabyo
- Written by: Duyu Tabyo; Padi Genda
- Produced by: Padi Genda
- Starring: Kargo Basar; Dipit Agarwal; Shekhar Nair; Aishna Sharma; Somet Chang; Meka Yukar; Boby Techi; Saurabh; Pramod; Talimoa Pongener; Amaan Khan Meher; Yarenthung Odyüo
- Cinematography: Imsüyanger Lemtür
- Edited by: Imsüyanger Lemtür; Yanrenthung Odyüo
- Music by: Haggai Rongmei; Purkümzük Jamir; Ina Zhimo; Molumeren Ozüküm
- Production companies: CoreConxept Entertainment; Padi Genda Pictures
- Release date: 18 August 2014
- Running time: 15 minutes
- Country: India
- Languages: English; Hindi

Stranger in My land is a 2014 Indian English/Hindi documentary-style short film written and directed by Duyu Tabyo, and produced and co-written by Padi Genda. The film was produced and released under the banner of CoreConxept Entertainment in association with Padi Genda Pictures.

Based upon the racial discrimination faced by people of Northeast India, the film attempts to portray the ignorance of the mainland Indians towards those from North-east India, and was released August 2014.

== Plot ==
The film opens with James (Kargo Basar) sitting at his desk and writing to Prime Minister of India Manmohan Singh regarding racially motivated attacks in Australia upon citizens of Northeast India. The man condemns racism and seeks ministerial attention toward the issues of similar discrimination within mainland India toward the people of Arunachal Pradesh. As the man's narration continues, the film shows recreations of the events of which he is concerned.

== Cast ==
- Kargo Basar as James
- Dipit Agarwal as Anil's son Dipit
- Shekhar Nair as Anil
- Aishna Sharma as Anil's wife
- Somet Chang as Girl in the kitchen
- Meka Yukar as College girl returning Home
- Boby Techi as Mapuii, the job applicant from Mizoram)
- Saurabh as Boss interviewing Mapuii
- Pramod as Minicab's driver
- Talimoa Pongener as Victim of stabbing
- Amaan Mehar as Attacker
- Yarenthung Odyüo as Man running past the stabbing
- Lumposen as Young boy dressed as Subhash Chandra Bose

== Production ==
Based upon real events in the life of Duyu Tabyo when he was victim of and heard of other incidents of discrimination suffered by people of Northeast India inflicted upon them in areas of mainland Indians, Tabyo set out beginning during December 2013, to create his film to address and document the racism. The film was shot in Delhi. Costume designed by Lucy Nelia Kolakhe and casting by Amaan Khan Meher.

== See also ==
- Boby Techi
- Racism
