= Boby-Księże =

- Village
- Location within Poland
- Coordinates: 51°2′24″N 22°2′13″E
- Country: Poland
- Voivodeship: Lublin
- County: Kraśnik
- Gmina: Urzędów
- Population: 2,644

Boby-Księże [ˈbɔbɨ ˈkɕɛ̃ʐɛ] is a village in the administrative district of Gmina Urzędów, within Kraśnik County, Lublin Voivodeship, in eastern Poland.
