= Langol =

Langol لنگل
- Village
- Location within Iran
- Coordinates: 36°51′47″N 49°50′10″E
- Country: Iran
- Province: Gilan
- County: Siahkal
- Bakhsh: Deylaman
- Rural District: Deylaman

Population (2006)
  - Total: 57
- Time zone: UTC+3:30 (IRST)

Langol (Persian: لنگل; also known as Lagūl, Langul, and Lankol) is a village in Deylaman Rural District, Deylaman District, Siahkal County, Gilan Province, Iran. At the 2016 census, its population was 43, in 18 families. Down from 57 in 2006.
