= The Vinyl Records =

Indian all-female band

The Vinyl Records (TVR), is an all-female, post-punk rock band based in New Delhi and Arunachal Pradesh. The band formed in February 2010, the band consists of lead vocalist and keytarist Cheyyrian Bark, percussionist Mithy Tatak, bass guitarist Minam Tekseng and lead guitarist & vocalist Band Jini. The band's debut album 'Whims' featured four tracks, which was followed-up in 2014 by their first internationally-released song; 'Ready, set, go!'. Since then, TVR has featured in publications such as 'The Times of India,' 'Rolling Stone India,' RSJ, Tehelka, NH7, Cosmopolitan (magazine) and Marie Claire magazine.

== Formation and releases ==
TVR was formed in February 2010 by Banu, Minam and Mithy. They were all students in Arunachal Pradesh; whose "love of punk music and rebellious attitudes brought them together". The band met their ex-manager Getem Apang at a different Arunachal school, and began to collaborate with lead vocalist Cheyyrian Bark after meeting her at a performance in Delhi. In 2011, TVR debuted on the Indian indie music scene after performing on MTV India's F1 Rocks show. The following year, they were among the finalists of Ray-Ban Never Hide Sounds; a national musical talent hunt show. In January 2014, TVR were selected as a top-performing artist for the Vans FRESH Off The Wall and performed at the India Bike Week Festival Goa.

TVR's 4-track debut EP "Whims" was released at Ziro Festival of Music in September 2013. They signed with Metal Postcard Records, Hong Kong, and released a music video for "Ready, Set, Go!"; their first international single. The band also crowd-funded another video for the title track from the EP "Whims". TVR released their self-titled debut album on 17 February 2017.

The band's formation and development was recorded in a documentary by Kobra, Now Delhi and the Danish Ministry of Foreign Affairs.

== Band members ==
- Cheyyrian Bark - born 17 September 1989, is from Guwahati, Assam, India and is the lead vocalist, keytar player, synths, keyboards and songwriter (2011–present). Bark was conferred a master's degree in political science by the University of Delhi and also has a diploma in fashion designing from NIFT.
- Banu Jini - born 20 June 1989, is from Itanagar, Arunachal Pradesh, India and is the guitarist and backing vocalist (2010–present).
- Minam Tekseng - born 20 April 1990, is from Itanagar, Arunachal Pradesh, India and is the bassist and backing vocalist (2010–present). Tekseng was conferred an undergraduate degree in English by the University of Delhi.
- Mithy Tatak - born 29 September 1989, is from Itanagar, Arunachal Pradesh, India and is the drummer, percussionist and backing vocalist (2010–present). Tatak was conferred an undergraduate degree in Biotechnology by the University of Delhi.

== Influences and style ==
The main Western musical bands influcening TVR's style include: CSS, The B52s, Blondie, The Clash, Bratmobile, Bikini Kill, The Strokes, Arctic Monkeys and The Ramones They say that they “look up to girl bands like CSS… Sahara Hotnights and The Donnas are the modern Riot Grrrls to us". Their style has been described as an alternative indie mixture, and frequently experiment with innovative sounds and styles.

== Performances ==
TVR has performed in various cities all across India, including shows such as the Ziro Festival of Music, Puma Loves Vinyl, The LOUDEST Gig in Delhi, Nh7 weekender etc. They also headlined the Maudit Tangue festival at Reunion Island, France in December 2017.

TVR performed at Control ALT Delete 6.0, Mumbai's entirely crowd-funded concert, The North-East Music Festival and Delhi Day Concert in Delhi and at The VANS New Wave Musicfest in Goa. The band also performed with Maria Anderson (from Sahara Hotnights) at the Red Bull Music Academy Festival in Sweden. The band's second international tour was BHIF (Bhutan International Festival, Thimphu) alongside artists such as lucky Ali. There, the band played three shows in the presence of the royal family.

The band's third international tour was at Réunion Island (France) which was a headlining act at 'Kabardock' with Maudit Tangue Label rock péi.
