= Urzędów =

- Town
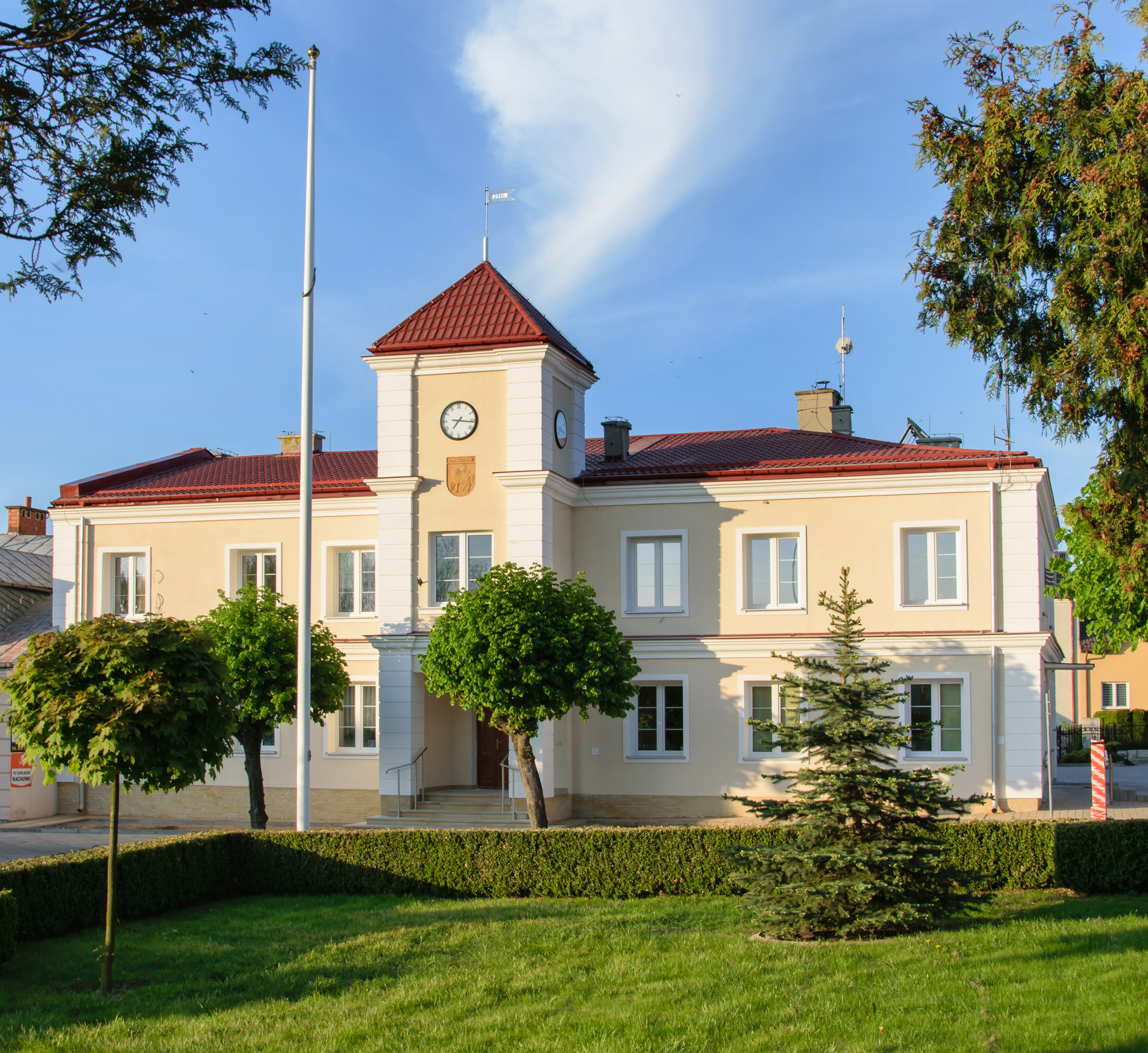
- Town hall

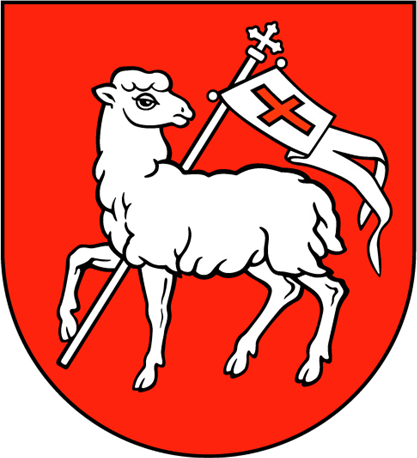
- Flag Coat of arms

- Location within Poland
- Coordinates: 50°59′N 22°9′E
- Country: Poland
- Voivodeship: Lublin
- County: Kraśnik
- Gmina: Urzędów
- Town rights: 1405

Population
  - Total: 1,060
- Time zone: UTC+1 (CET)
  - Summer (DST): UTC+2 (CEST)
- Vehicle registration: LKR
- Website: http://www.urzedow.pl

Urzędów [uˈʐɛnduf] is a town in Kraśnik County, Lublin Voivodeship, in eastern Poland. It is the seat of the gmina (administrative district) called Gmina Urzędów. The town has a population of 1,060, and in 1405–1869 it had a status of a town, regained in 2016.

Urzędów lies on the Urzędówka river, among the hills of the Lublin Upland.

== History ==
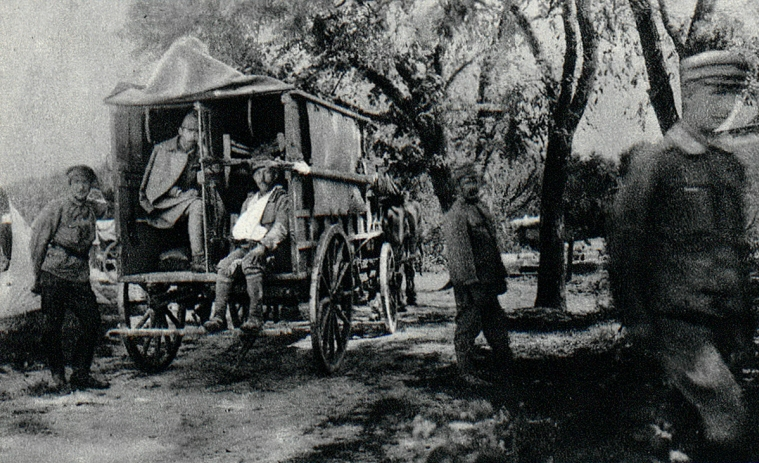
Wounded Polish legionnaires in Urzędów during World War I

In the past, it used to be one of major urban centers of eastern Lesser Poland, placed on a merchant road from Kraków to Lublin, and further on to Lithuania. The town was granted Magdeburg rights in 1405 by King Władysław Jagiełło, replacing two villages – Zaborzyce and Skorczyce, which had existed in the location of Urzędów. In 1474 it became the seat of a county in Lublin Voivodeship, which in the same year was carved out of Sandomierz Voivodeship. Urzędów remained an important urban center of the area until the mid-17th century, when, after long-lasting conflicts with the Cossacks and the Swedes (see Deluge, Khmelnytsky Uprising) it was burned.

According to the 1921 census, the town had a population of 3,563, 92.1% Polish and 7.8% Jewish.

=== Jewish minority ===
During the reign of King Augustus III (1733–1763) people living in Urzędów repeatedly complained to him about being oppressed by the Jews. In 1791 they demanded that starost Kazimierz Rzewuski should expel the remaining Jews from the town. In 1781 there were as few as 11 Jews in Urzędów (0.5% of the entire population). It was not until after 1862 that Urzędów started to receive a steady influx of Jews. At the end of the 19th century the Urzędów kehilla was formed. Though small, the Jewish community was active in social and economic life of the town. In 1889 there were 3.017 residents in Urzędów, out of whom 242 (8%) were Jewish. In 1900 it was inhabited by 3,620 people, including 303 Jews (8.37%).

Before the outbreak of World War II about 40 Jewish families lived in Urzędów (i.e., about 300 people). During the war, on September 23, 1939, German occupation authorities ordered that Jewish children be banned from state schools. Since January 5, 1940 the Jews had to wear a band with the Star of David on their left arms. In October 1942 Jews from Urzędów were transported to the Kraśnik ghetto and Budzyń forced labor camp, which were just stopovers on their trip to Bełżec gas chambers.

During the German occupation, 300 Jews from Urzędów were killed. The Jewish cemetery was plundered during World War II and afterwards. In 1993, local inhabitants arranged a matzevot-shaped plaque in memory of Urzędów Jews murdered by the Nazis from 1939-1944. In August 2012, it was discovered that the plaque was full of graffiti and the area is contaminated with broken bottles of alcohol and rubbish.

== Twin towns ==
Urzędów is twinned with:

- Nádudvar, Hungary
- Stara Vyzhivka, Ukraine
