= Dąbrowa-Bór =

- Village
- Location within Poland
- Coordinates: 50°58′N 22°14′E
- Country: Poland
- Voivodeship: Lublin
- County: Kraśnik
- Gmina: Kraśnik

Dąbrowa-Bór (Polish pronunciation: [dɔmˈbrɔva ˈbur]) is a village in the administrative district of Gmina Kraśnik, within Kraśnik County, Lublin Voivodeship, in eastern Poland.
