= Boby-Wieś =

- Village
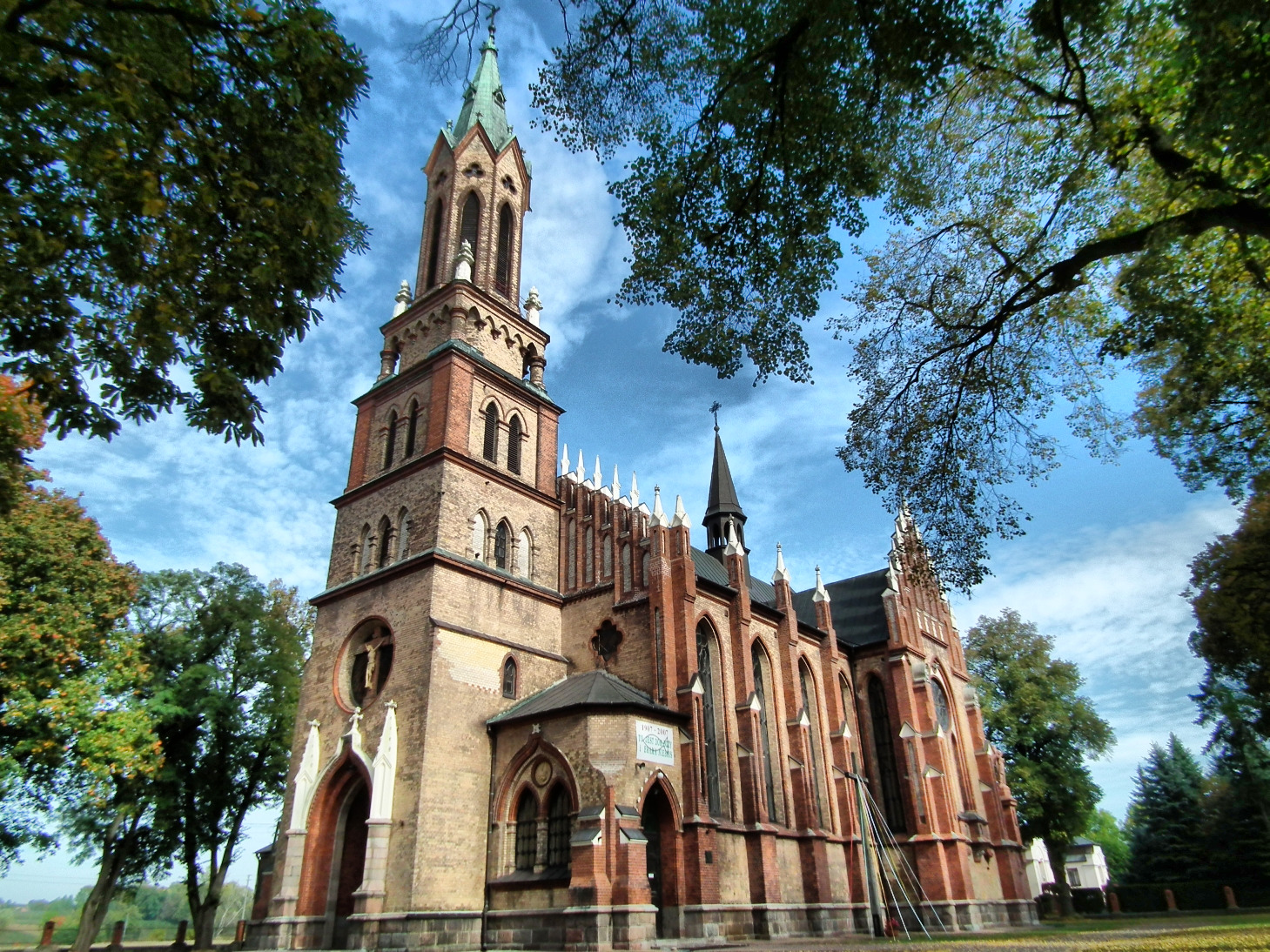
- Sacred Heart church in Boby-Wieś

- Location within Poland
- Coordinates: 51°1′47″N 22°1′23″E
- Country: Poland
- Voivodeship: Lublin
- County: Kraśnik
- Gmina: Urzędów
- Time zone: UTC+1 (CET)
  - Summer (DST): UTC+2 (CEST)
- Vehicle registration: LKR

Boby-Wieś [ˈbɔbɨ ˈvjɛɕ] is a village in the administrative district of Gmina Urzędów, within Kraśnik County, Lublin Voivodeship, in eastern Poland.
