= Kraśnik =

Town in Lublin Voivodeship, Poland

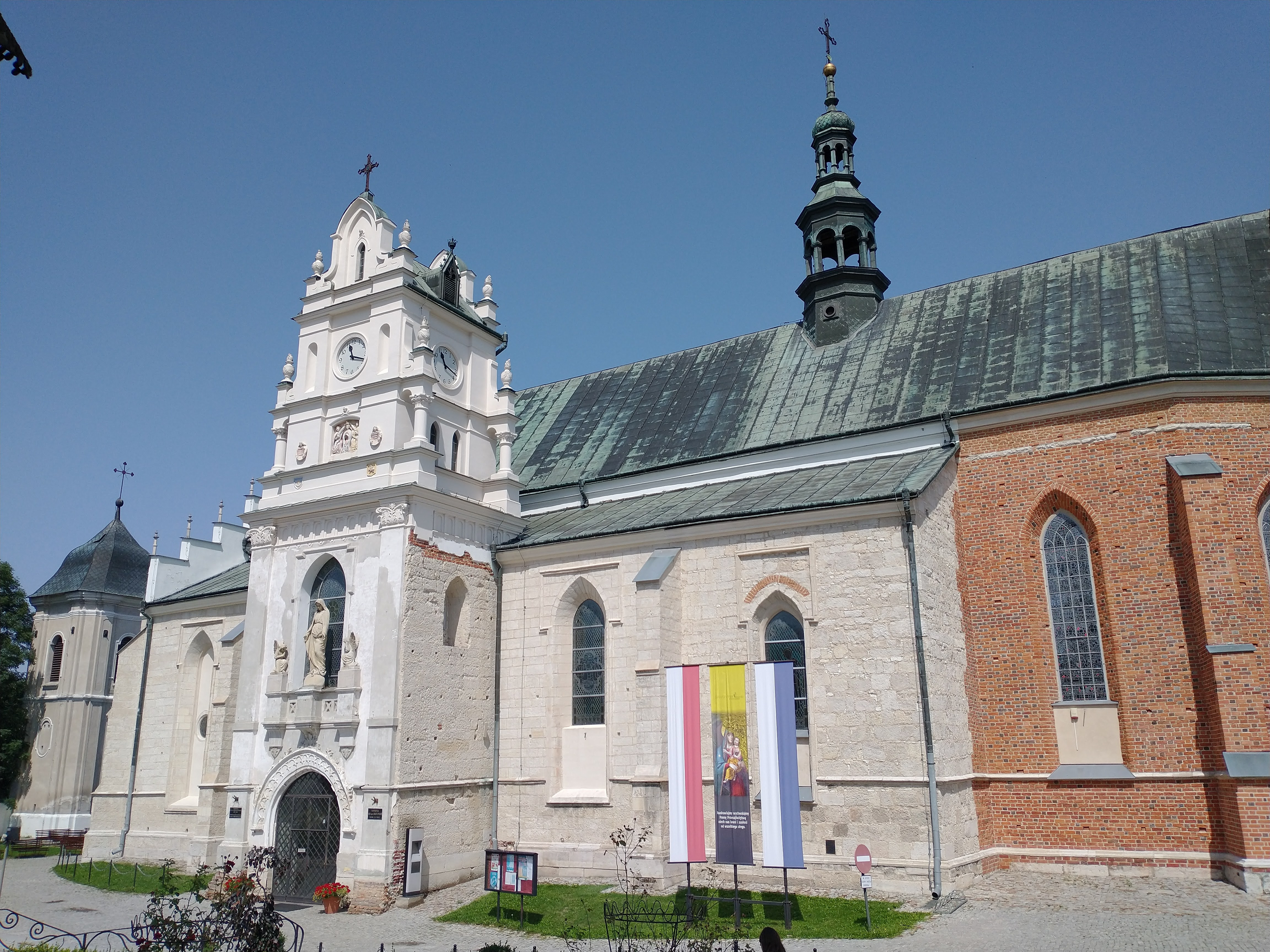
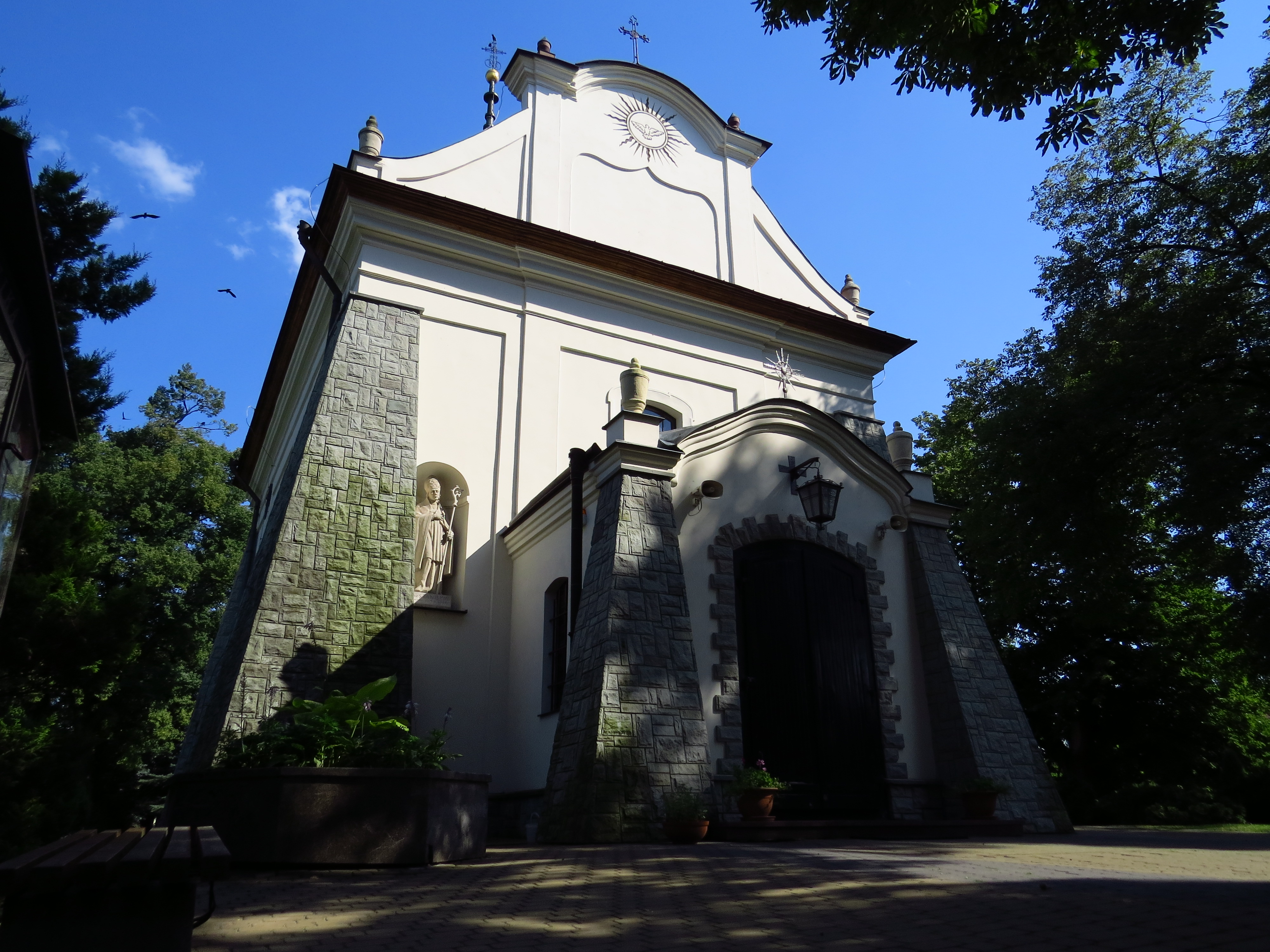
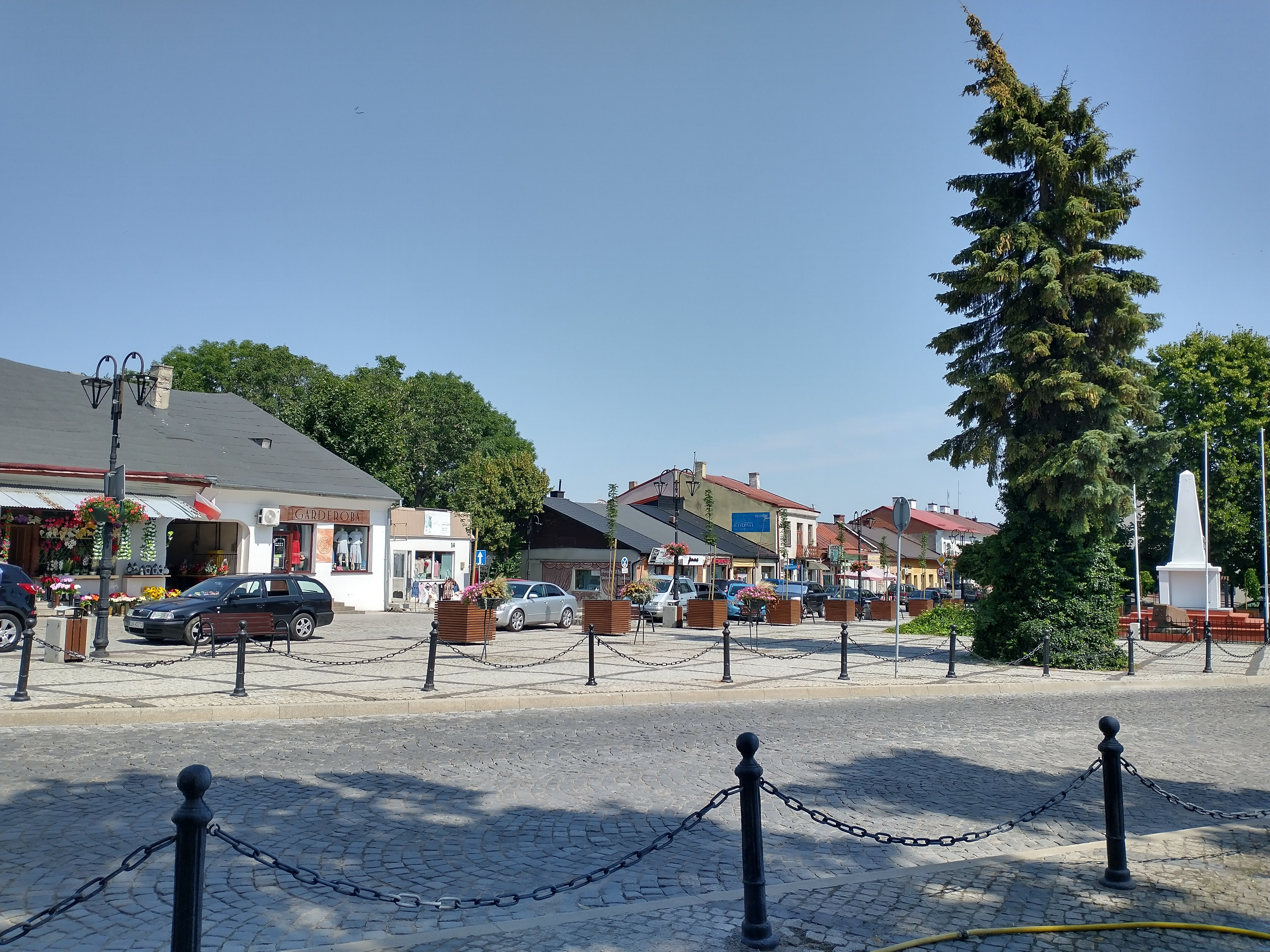
- Church of the Assumption Holy Spirit church Town center

- Flag Coat of arms

- Location within Poland
- Coordinates: 50°55′N 22°13′E
- Country: Poland
- Voivodeship: Lublin
- County: Kraśnik
- Gmina: Kraśnik (urban gmina)
- Established: 14th century
- Town rights: 1377

Government
  - Mayor: Krzysztof Staruch (Ind.)

Area
  - Total: 25.29 km^{2} (9.76 sq mi)

Population (2024)
  - Total: 30 842
  - Density: 1.2/km^{2} (3.1/sq mi)
- Time zone: UTC+1 (CET)
  - Summer (DST): UTC+2 (CEST)
- Postal code: 05-085, 05-000
- Area code: +48 81
- Car plates: LKR
- Website: http://www.krasnik.eu

Kraśnik [ˈkraɕɲik] is a town in southeastern Poland with 30 842 inhabitants (2024), situated in the Lublin Voivodeship, historic Lesser Poland. It is the seat of Kraśnik County. The town of Kraśnik as it is known today was created in 1975, after the merger of its two districts - Kraśnik Lubelski, and Kraśnik Fabryczny.

== Location and districts ==
Kraśnik is located in Lesser Poland, among the hills of Lublin Upland, 49 kilometers south-west of Lublin. The town is divided into two major parts, which are a few kilometers apart: Kraśnik Fabryczny and Kraśnik Lubelski (or Kraśnik Stary, Old Kraśnik). The town has an area of 25.28 square kilometers, of which arable land makes up 45%, and forests 17%.

=== Kraśnik Lubelski ===
Kraśnik Lubelski is the original part of the town where all historic buildings are located. It is made of several districts, such as Old Town, Bojanówka, Koszary, Góry, Zarzecze, Kwiatkowice, and Osiedle Kolejowe. Kraśnik Lubelski has old churches and the oldest cemetery of the town, as well as a rail station, a bus station and main administrative offices of the county. It is also a major road junction, where future Expressway S19 (current National Road No. 19) meets National Road No. 74. Until 2010, the Road 74 went through the center of Kraśnik, but now there is a by-pass.

=== Kraśnik Fabryczny ===
Kraśnik Fabryczny was founded in the late 1930s, as a settlement for State Ammunition Factory No. 2 (Panstwowe Fabryka Amunicji nr. 2), one of the enterprises built as part of the Central Industrial Region. Previously, in the location of Kraśnik Fabryczny there was the village of Dąbrowa Bór, placed a few kilometers northwest of Kraśnik, in a forest between Kraśnik and Urzędów. The government of the Second Polish Republic planned a new settlement, built from scratch, for 6,000 people around the new Ammunition Factory No. 2, FLT-Kraśnik. After the war, the settlement of Dąbrowa Bór was expanded, and in 1954 its name was changed to Kraśnik Fabryczny. In the 1960s, a number of single-family houses was built, later on, several blocks of flats were constructed. On October 1, 1975, Kraśnik Fabryczny merged with Kraśnik Lubelski, and the villages of Budzyń and Piaski, creating the town of Kraśnik. Currently, Kraśnik Fabryczny has some 20,000 inhabitants.

== History ==
The area of Kraśnik was first settled in the 13th century, and the town received its city charter in 1377, by King Louis I. At that time it belonged to Sandomierz Voivodeship, and then from 1474 it belonged to the Lublin Voivodeship of the Lesser Poland Province. Located on a busy merchant road from Silesia to Kyiv, Kraśnik in the 14th century belonged to the Gorajski family. In 1403, it had a parish church of Saint Paul, and in 1410, as a dowry of Anna of Goraj, it passed into the hands of the Tęczyński family. Later on, it belonged to other families, such as the Radziwiłłs, and in 1604, the town was purchased by hetman Jan Zamoyski. Until 1866, Kraśnik belonged to the Zamoyski family. The town frequently suffered from fires, it was also destroyed by the Swedes in 1657, during the Deluge.

Since the 14th century, Kraśnik was surrounded by a rampart, and ca. 1465, stone-brick walls were built on initiative of Jan Tęczyński, with two gates - Lublin Gate and Sandomierz Gate. The walls were demolished in the second half of the 19th century. Kraśnik also had a defensive church, surrounded with a high wall, and a castle, built in the 14th century on a hill surrounded by swamps. By 1646, the castle was already neglected. In 1657, it was completely destroyed by the Swedes.

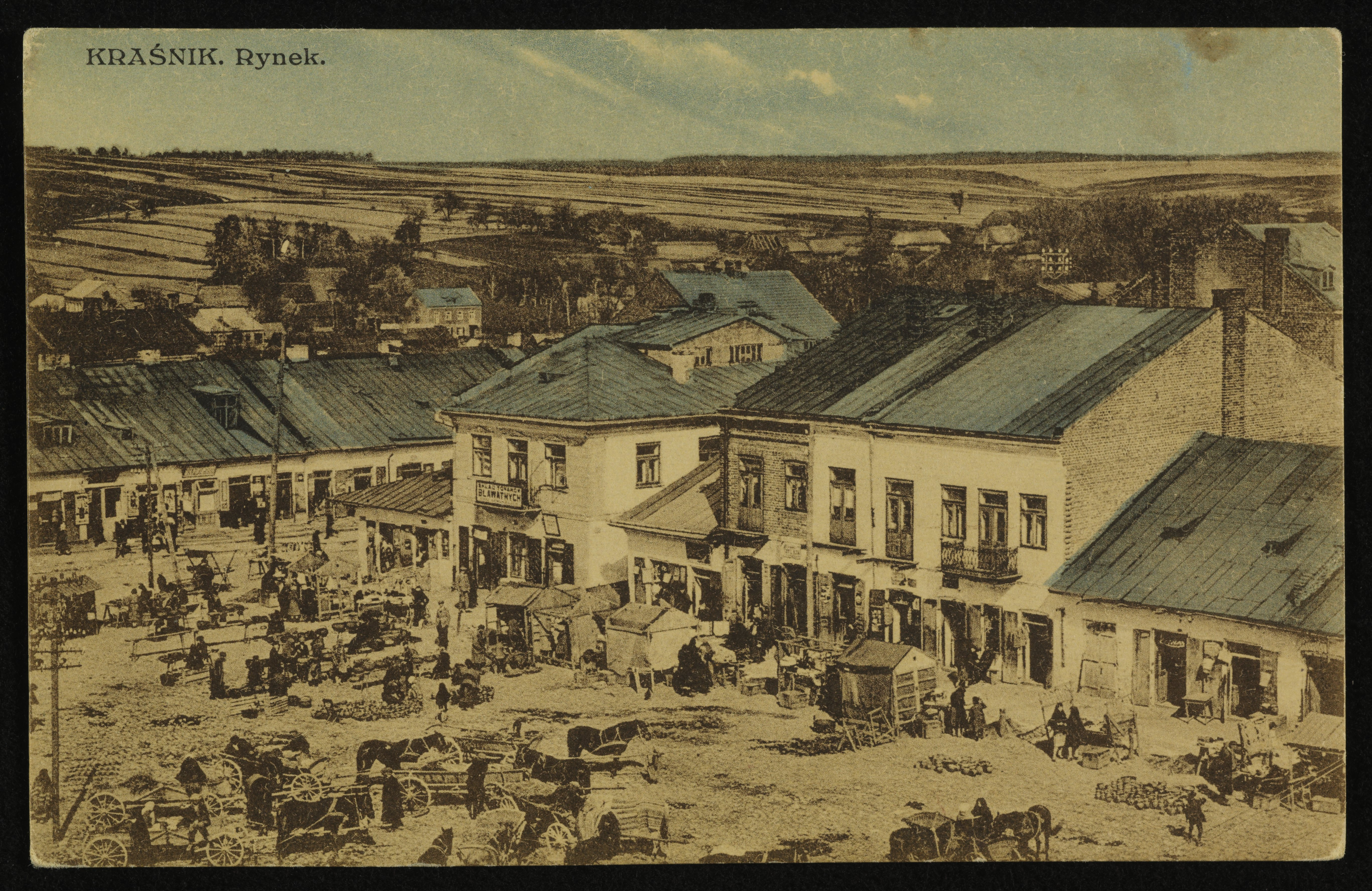
Kraśnik in the early 20th century

During the Third Partition of Poland (1795), Kraśnik passed into Austrian hands. After the Polish victory in the Austro-Polish War of 1809, it became part of the short-lived Duchy of Warsaw, and after the duchy's dissolution in 1815, it was part of Russian-controlled Congress Poland. In August 1914, the town and surrounding area were a focal point of Battle of Kraśnik, an opening battle of the World War I struggle between Russia and Central Powers over control of Galicia. During the war, the town gained its first railway connection, as a line was built through it by the Russians in 1914 in order to deliver supplies to the front. Later on, the line was expanded, and now it joins Lublin with Stalowa Wola. In the interwar period, the Polish 24th Uhlan Regiment was garrisoned in Kraśnik.

In 1938 Kraśnik was selected as the location for an ammunition factory (see Central Industrial Region). The factory was not finished by the time World War II broke out in 1939, and during the German occupation it was used to manufacture parts for Heinkel planes and other purposes. After the war, in 1948, the factory was started up again, this time to produce ball bearings (the first factory to do that in Poland).

=== Jews in Kraśnik ===
==== 16th century to WWII ====
As with much of the Lublin district, Kraśnik was a major center of Judaism, with 5,000 Jews (almost 50% of the population) prior to World War II. Historical accounts place Jews in the area in 1531, but the official right to settle there was granted to Jews in 1584. In 1654, Jewish residence was officially limited to the area near the synagogue, but in practice this was not rigidly enforced.

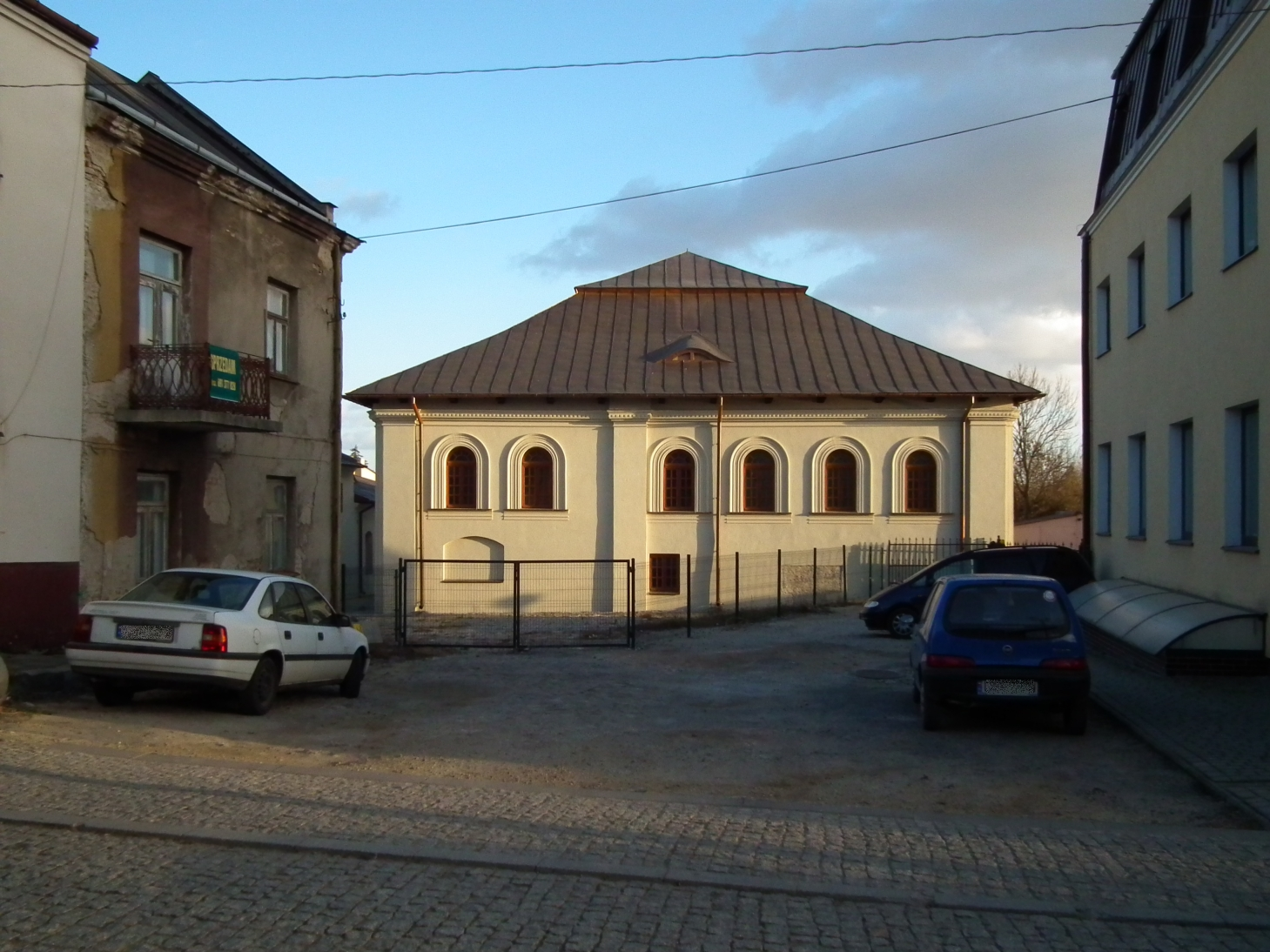
Great Synagogue (1654) in Kraśnik

==== WWII and Holocaust ====
Following the invasion of Poland by Nazi Germany and the Soviet Union in World War II, Kraśnik was occupied by Nazi Germany. It was the site of the Budzyń concentration camp, where the prisoners worked for the Heinkel Flugzeugwerke, an initially Polish aircraft production factory which had been taken over by the Germans. This camp, with around 3,000 Jews, became a subcamp of Majdanek.

There was another labor camp in Kraśnik called the WIFO Labor Camp, Kraśnik Labor Camp, or Arbeitslager Skret, lit. 'Skret Labor Camp', located in the ghetto at Szkolna and Bóżnicza streets. It held a similar number of inmates (around 3,000), most of whom were murdered.

From a population of more than 5,000 Kraśnik Jews, only an estimated 350 survived the Holocaust; most or all of these survivors left Poland.

== Sights ==
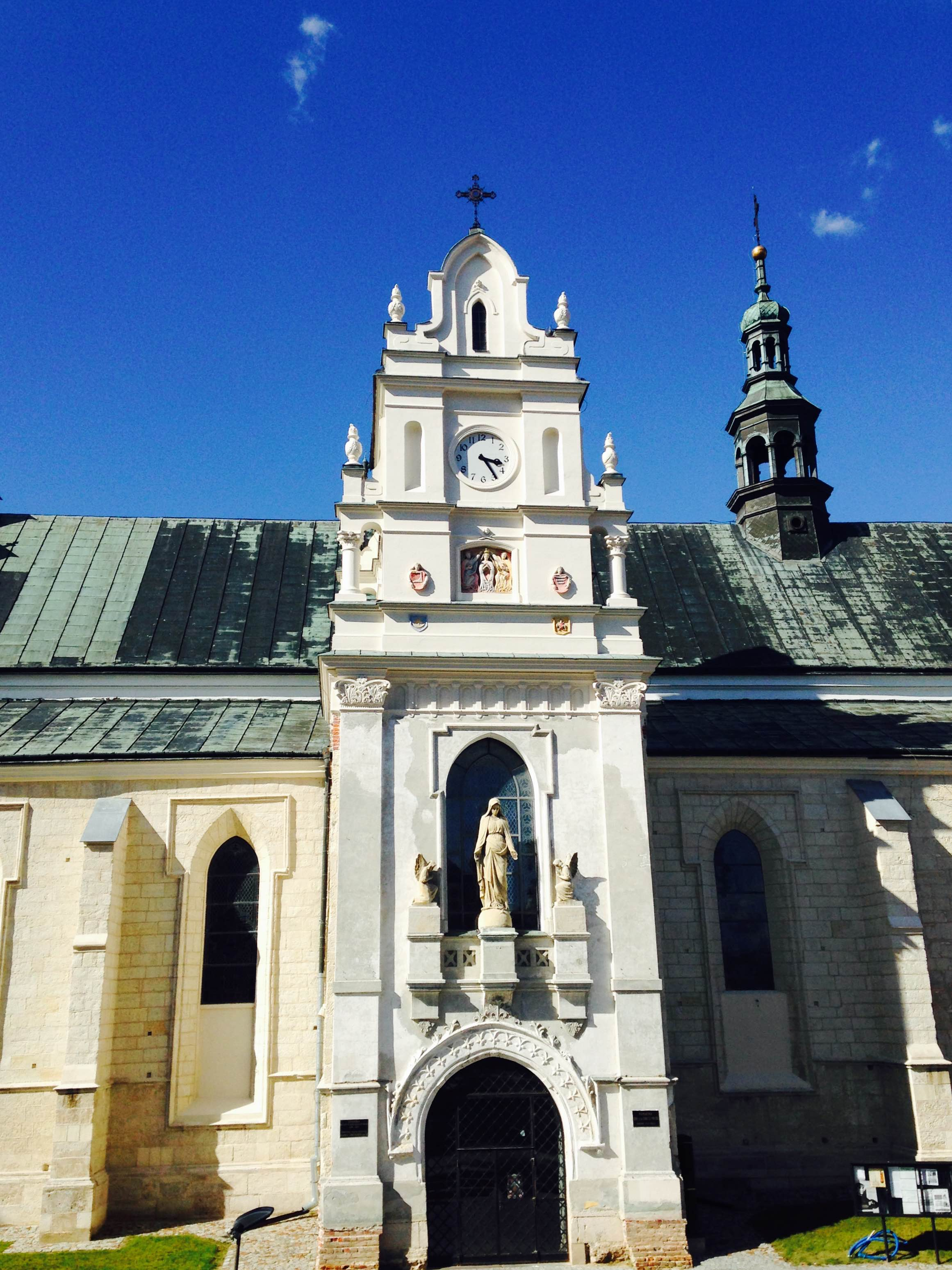
Gothic-Renaissance Church of the Assumption

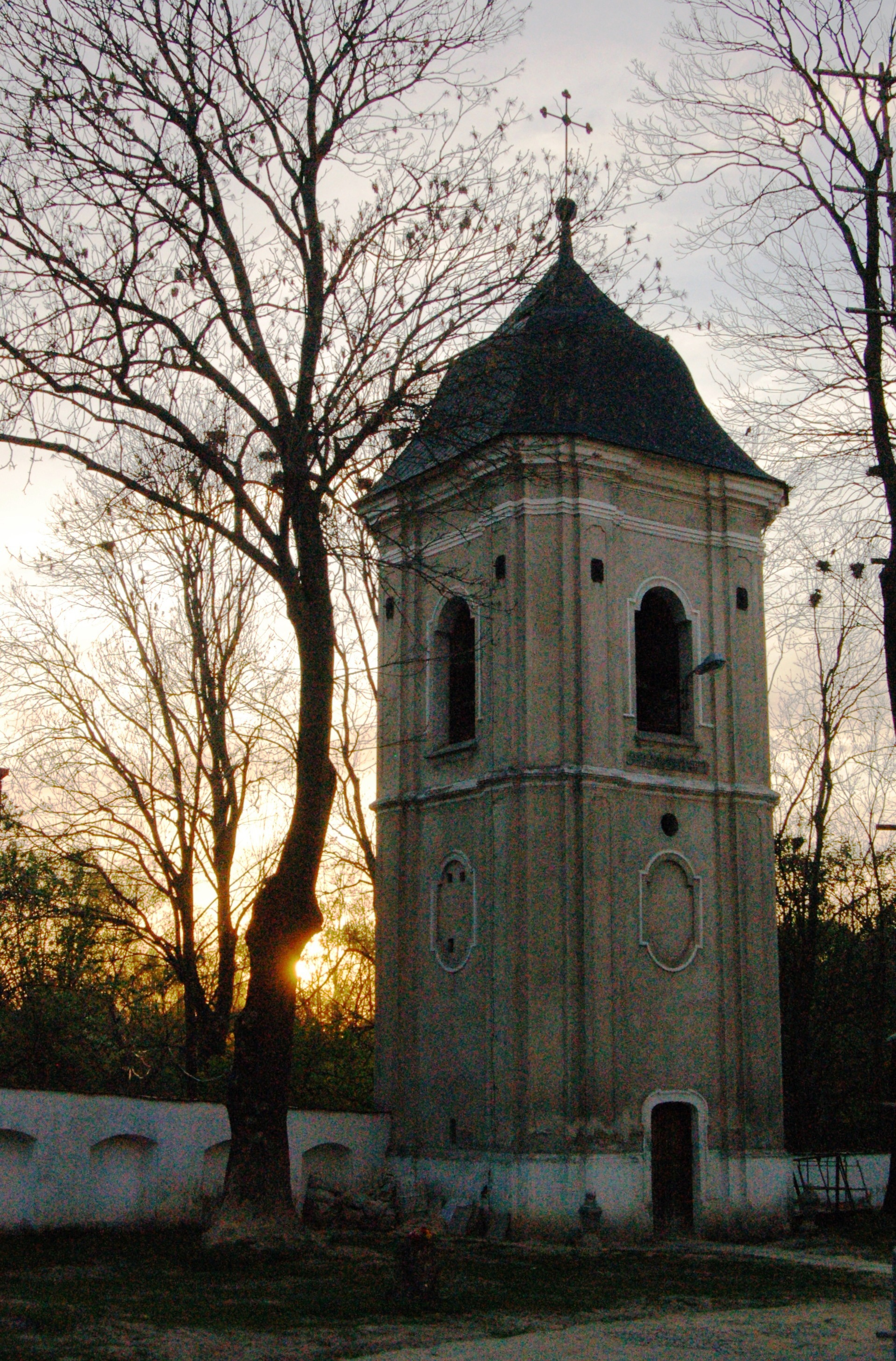
Monastery bell tower

- The Lateran Canons, containing St Mary's Ascension church (ca 1469) with paintings by T. Dolabella, gravestones of the Teczynski family, and the monastery (15th-18th centuries),
- The 18th-century Baroque former Hospital Church of the Holy Spirit (1758–1761) and hospital,
- Ruins of the 17th-century Zamoyski castle,
- An unusual double synagogue from the 17th century, partially renovated but now in disrepair
- 2nd SOS Children's Village in Poland, established in 1991,

== Economy ==
- Tsubaki-Hoover Polska Limited Liability Company, a subsidiary of Tsubaki Nakashima, which manufactures ball and roller bearings

== Sports ==
Kraśnik has a sports club Stal, which was founded in 1948.

== International relations ==
=== Twin towns ===
Kraśnik is twinned with:

- Hajdúböszörmény, Hungary
- Ruiselede, Belgium
- Šilalė, Lithuania
- Korosten, Ukraine
- Turiisk, Ukraine
- Trogir, Croatia

Former twin towns:

- Nogent-sur-Oise, France (In February 2020, the French commune suspended its partnership with Kraśnik as a reaction to the passing of an anti-LGBT resolution by the Kraśnik local authorities.)

== Controversies ==
=== LGBT-free zone (2019-2021) ===
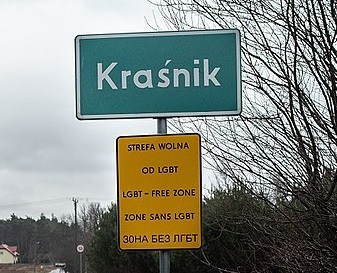
One of the Bartosz Staszewski art instillations portraying the municipality as what he calls an "LGBT-free zone"

In 2019, Kraśnik's city council has adopted an LGBT-free zone resolution, which led to the city's budget losing 10 million euros from EEA and Norway Grants, getting expelled from a European Union twin town cooperation program and losing twin town status with Nogent-sur-Oise. In 2021, an appeal to repeal the vote by the mayor was rejected by the town council. The resolution was finally overturned on April 29, 2021.

=== 5G-free zone ===
On 24 September 2020, Kraśnik councilors voted to consider the ban on 5G mobile telephony in the city. Support was given to the petition of the "Poland Free from 5G Coalition Association" (pl: Stowarzyszenie Koalicja Polska Wolna od 5G), which also provides for an order to dismantle Wi-Fi networks in schools.

== See also ==
- Jelita Coat of Arms
