= Kraśnik County =

Kraśnik County Powiat kraśnicki
- County
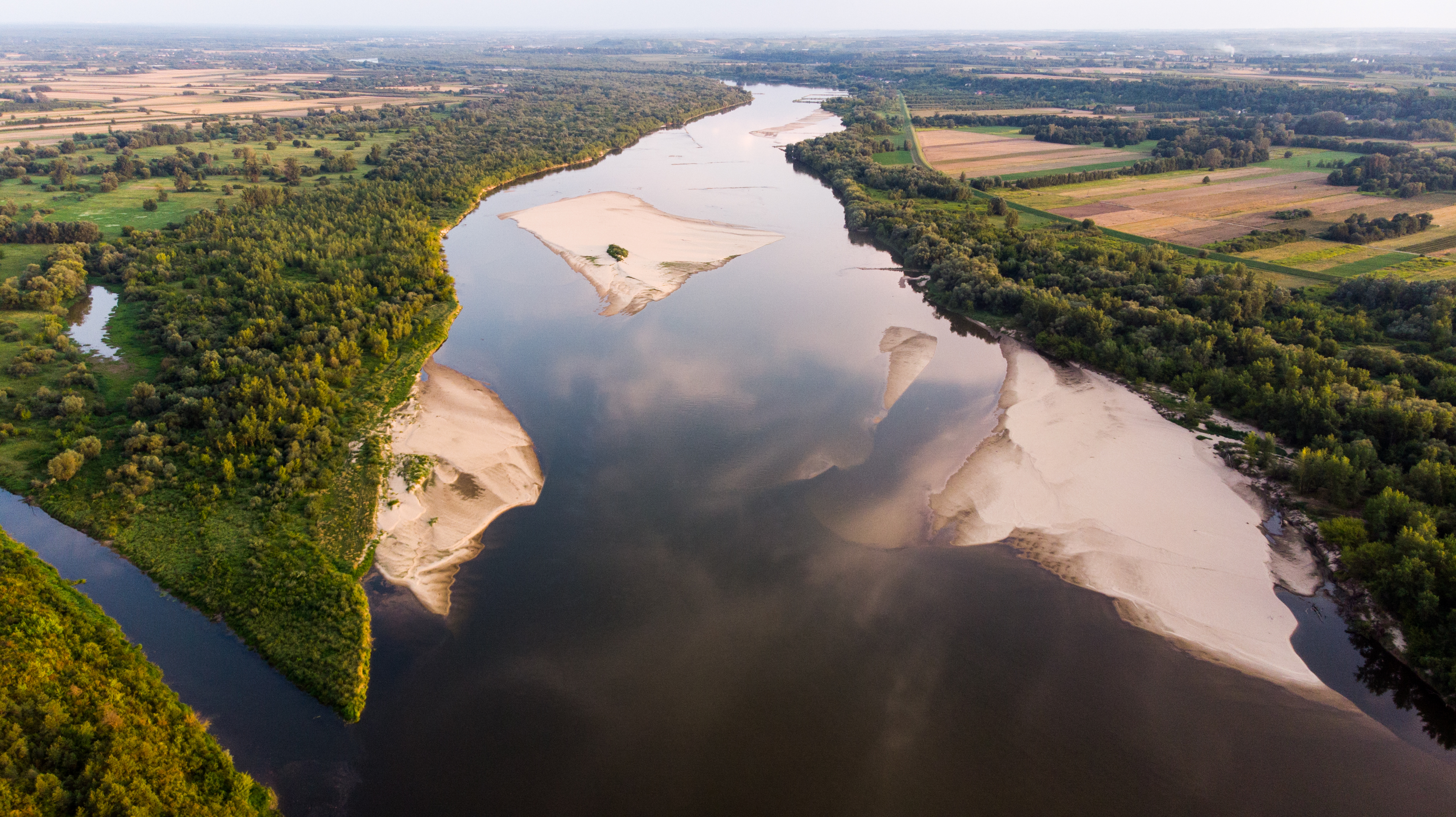
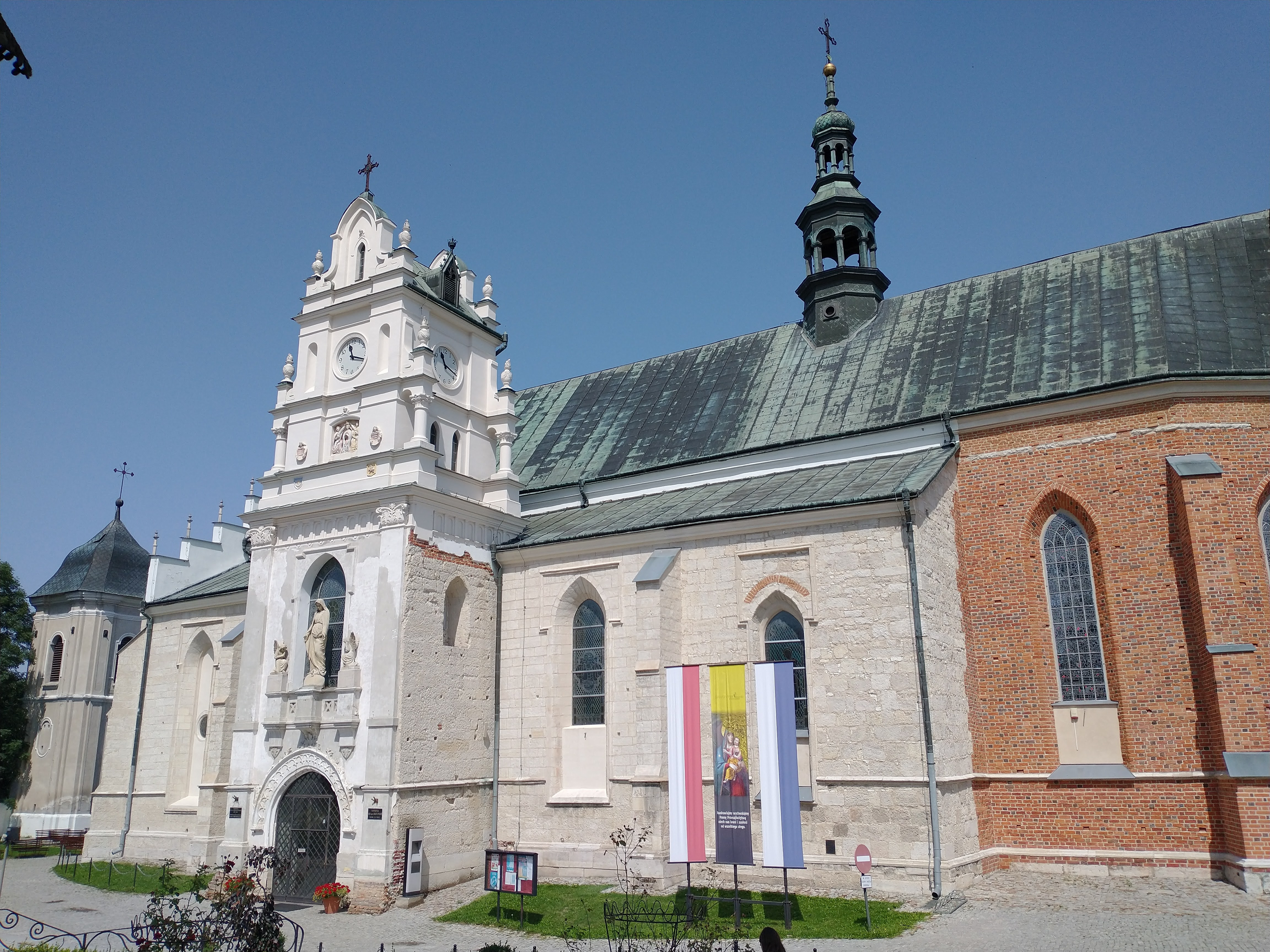
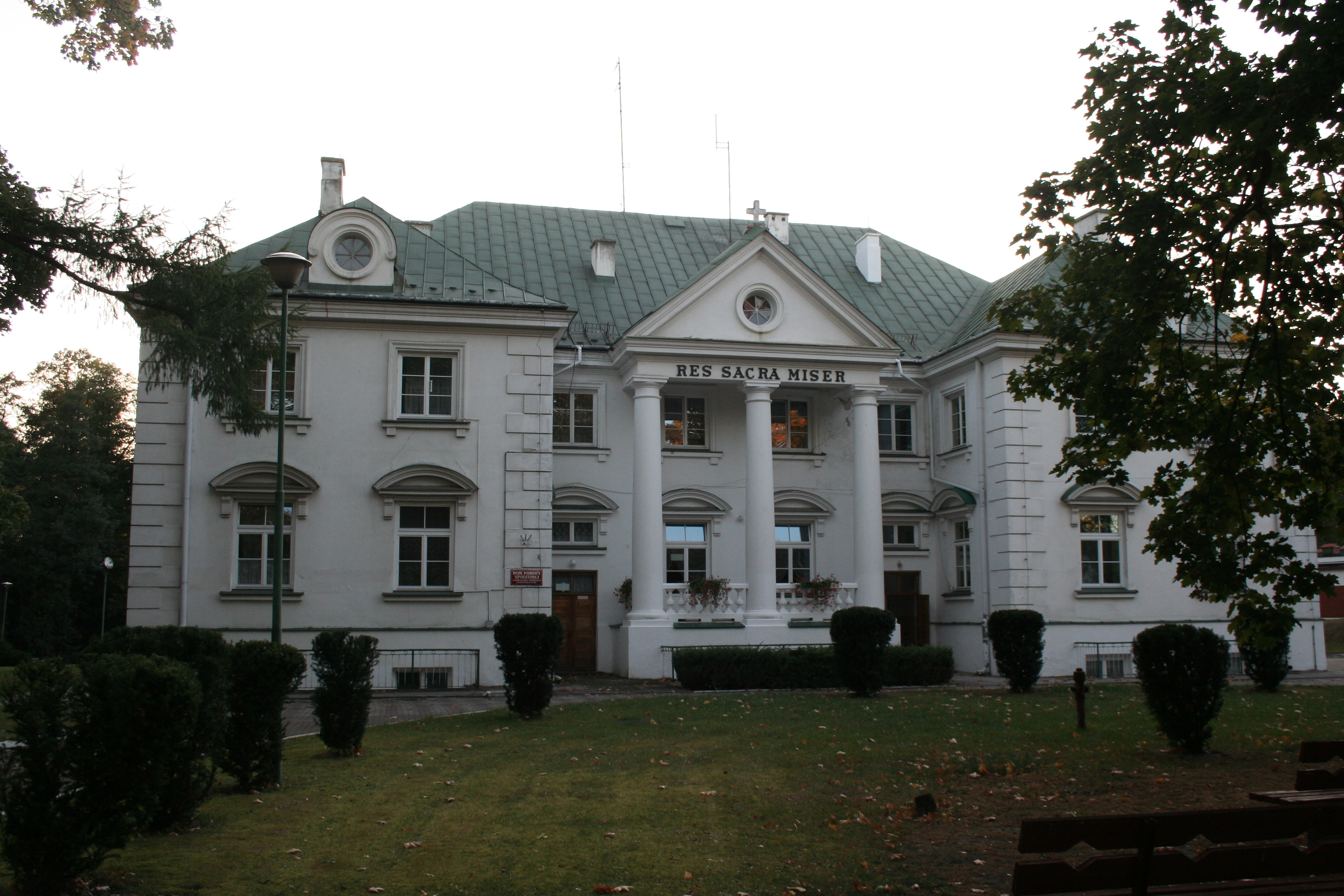
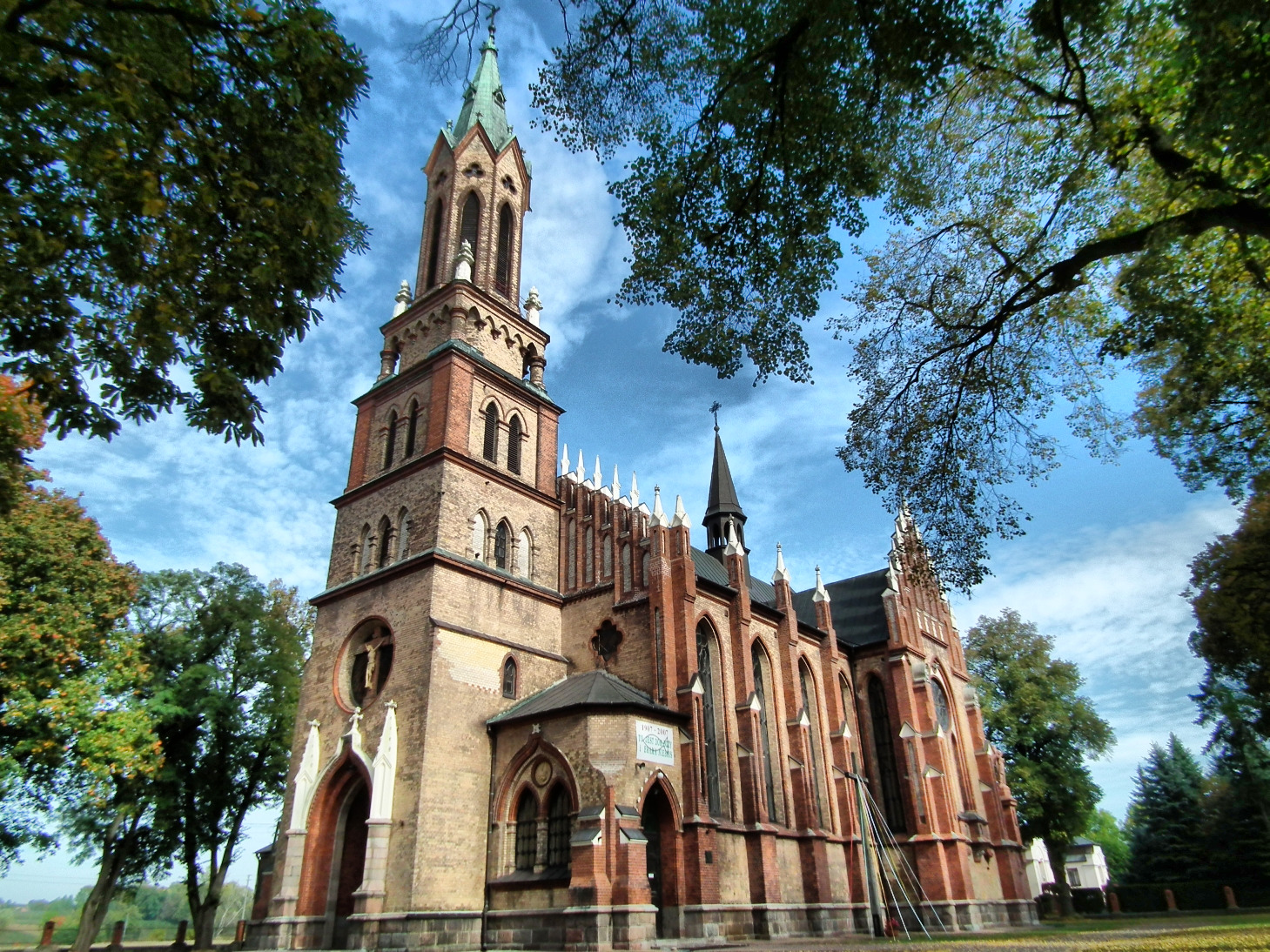
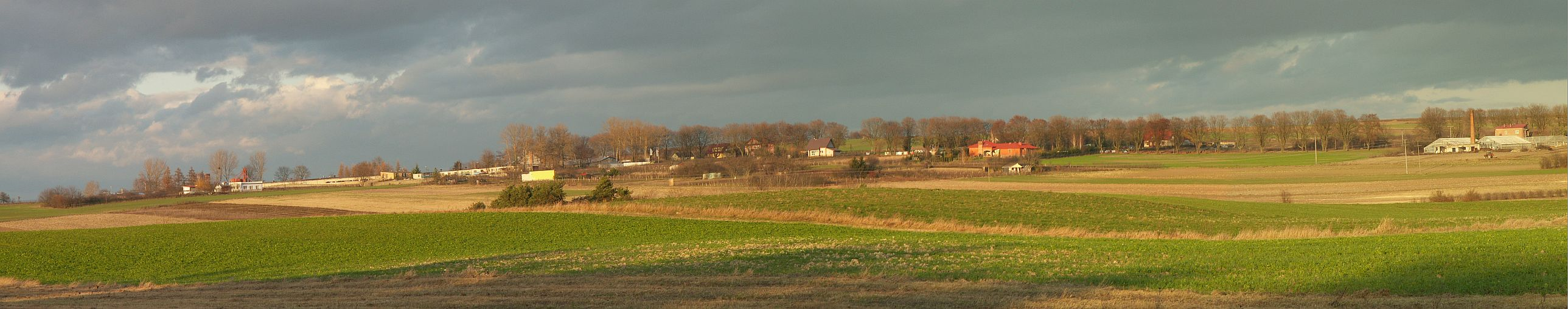
- Vistula near Annopol Assumption Church in Kraśnik Palace in Gościeradów Sacred Heart church in Boby-Wieś Countryside near Urzędów

- Flag Coat of arms

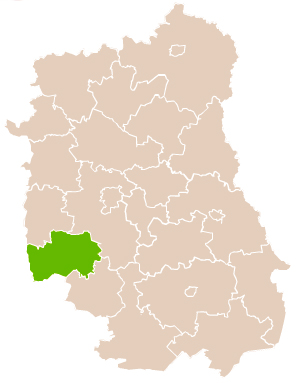
- Location within the voivodeship
- Coordinates (Kraśnik): 50°55′N 22°13′E
- Country: Poland
- Voivodeship: Lublin
- Seat: Kraśnik
- Gminas: Total 10 (incl. 1 urban): Kraśnik; Gmina Annopol; Gmina Dzierzkowice; Gmina Gościeradów; Gmina Kraśnik; Gmina Szastarka; Gmina Trzydnik Duży; Gmina Urzędów; Gmina Wilkołaz; Gmina Zakrzówek

Area
  - Total: 1,005.34 km^{2} (388.16 sq mi)

Population (2019)
  - Total: 93,919
  - Density: 93.420/km^{2} (241.96/sq mi)
  - Urban: 36,870
  - Rural: 57,049
- Time zone: UTC+1 (CET)
  - Summer (DST): UTC+2 (CEST)
- Car plates: LKR
- Website: www.powiatkrasnicki.pl

Kraśnik County (Polish: powiat kraśnicki) is a unit of territorial administration and local government (powiat) in Lublin Voivodeship, eastern Poland. It was established on January 1, 1999, as a result of the Polish local government reforms passed in 1998. Its administrative seat and largest town is Kraśnik, which lies 45 kilometres (28 mi) south-west of the regional capital Lublin. Other towns in the county are Annopol and Urzędów.

The county covers an area of 1,005.34 square kilometres (388.2 sq mi). As of 2019, its total population is 93,919, out of which the population of Kraśnik is 34,355, that of Annopol is 2,515, and the rural population is 57,049.

== Neighbouring counties ==
Kraśnik County is bordered by Lublin County to the north-east, Janów County and Stalowa Wola County to the south, Sandomierz County to the south-west, Opatów County to the west, and Opole County to the north-west.

== Administrative divisions ==
The county is subdivided into 10 gminas (one urban, two urban-rural and seven rural). These are listed in the following table, in descending order of population.

Gmina	Type	Area (km^{2})	Population (2019)	Seat
Kraśnik	urban	25.3	34,355	
Gmina Annopol	urban-rural	151.1	8,628	Annopol
Gmina Kraśnik	rural	105.4	7,339	Kraśnik *
Gmina Gościeradów	rural	158.6	7,229	Gościeradów
Gmina Urzędów	urban-rural	119.1	6,899	Urzędów
Gmina Zakrzówek	rural	99.1	6,491	Zakrzówek
Gmina Trzydnik Duży	rural	104.7	6,396	Trzydnik Duży
Gmina Szastarka	rural	73.5	5,769	Szastarka
Gmina Wilkołaz	rural	81.9	5,520	Wilkołaz
Gmina Dzierzkowice	rural	86.8	5,293	Dzierzkowice
* seat not part of the gmina
