= The Babin Republic =

Oil painting

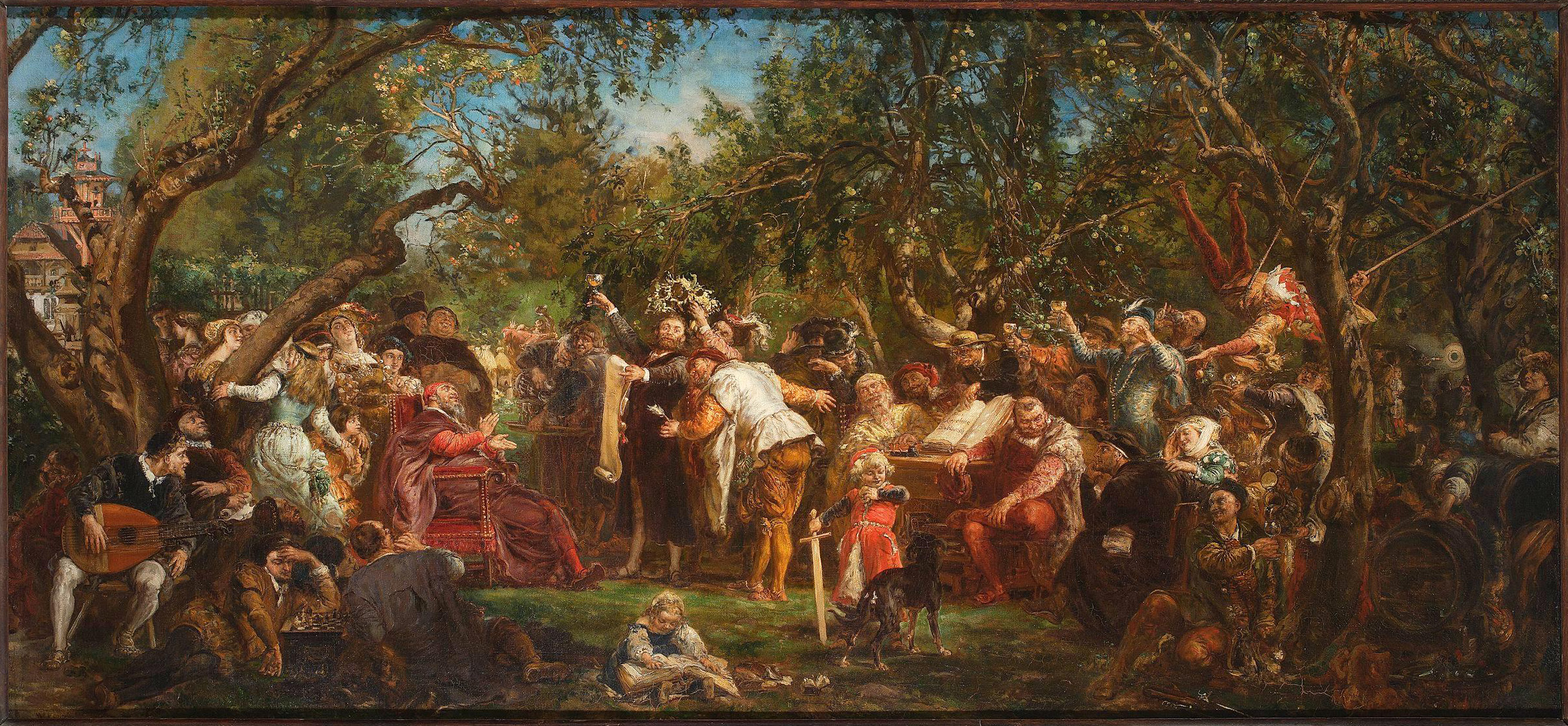
- Artist: Jan Matejko
- Year: 1881
- Medium: oil painting
- Dimensions: 96 cm × 200 cm (38 in × 79 in)
- Location: National Museum, Warsaw

The Babin Republic (Polish: Rzeczpospolita Babińska) is an oil painting by Jan Matejko from 1881. This painting depicts a meeting of the Babin Republic, a literary society founded in the sixteenth-century Polish–Lithuanian Commonwealth which left a long-lasting impression on Polish culture. Currently, the painting is in the collection of the National Museum in Warsaw.

== The Babin Republic society ==
The Babin Republic was a literary society founded in the second half of the 16th century during the reign of Sigismund II Augustus. The two founders – Stanisław Pszonka and Piotr Kaszowski – were Calvinists who promoted a laissez-faire approach to religion. The society valued freedom of religion. The core members of the Babin Republic were nobles (szlachta) based in Lublin Voivodeship but the society attracted many honorary guests from other parts of the Commonwealth including, but not limited to, Jan Kochanowski, Mikołaj Rej, and Jan Andrzej Morsztyn. These were some of the most esteemed Polish poets of the day who refined the modern Polish language. The meetings were held in Babin in modern-day Lublin Voivodeship.

The society's structure satirised that of the Polish-Lithuanian Commonwealth, with the founders assigning titles to members based on their boastful, humorous stories rather than merit or actual achievements. Thus the Babin Republic came to appoint their military commanders (hetman), archbishops, clerks, government officials, senators and Masters of the Hunt. With time, the Babin Republic became synonymous with absurd humour and remained such till the 19th century, when some Polish writers would refer to Babin in their literary works.

== Provenance ==
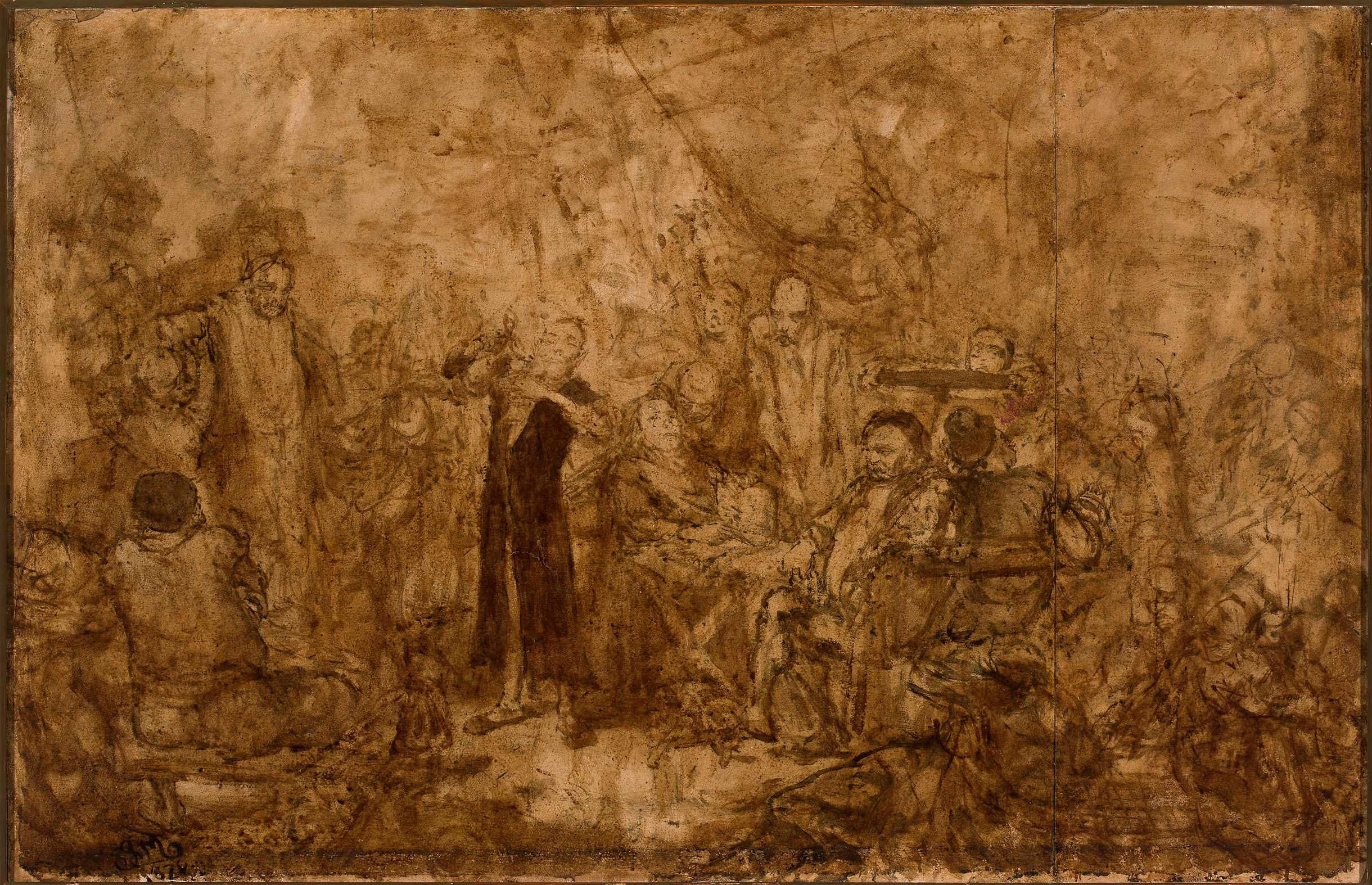
Jan Matejko, preparatory drawing for The Babin Republic, 1870, National Museum in Warsaw

According to Krystyna Sroczyńska, the painting originally belonged to Marian Gorzkowski, a close friend of Jan Matejko and the most prolific collector of Matejko among his contemporaries. In 1938, four paintings from Gorzkowski's collection, including The Babin Republic (1881), were sent on a loan to the National Museum in Warsaw for an exhibition. Afterwards, the museum was entrusted with storing the paintings. The Babin Republic left the museum's collections during the Second World War but was later revindicated and returned to the National Museum in Warsaw.

== Description ==
Jan Matejko conveyed the cheerfulness of Babin by placing a light-filled orchard in the background. The landscape could have been modelled after Matejko's own Manor House in Krzesławice. The motif of play and banqueting in a serene natural environment derives from the literary genre of the pastoral, which was widely popular in Renaissance Europe. The roots of pastoral literature go back to the classical period and so the genre was revived in the Renaissance, a period fascinated with the ideas and achievements of classical antiquity. Poland had its own share of pastoral writers, most notably including the aforementioned member of the Babin Republic – Jan Kochanowski. Pastoral, as a secular genre of literature, fits the humanistic outlook of the Babin Republic and its indifference to the topic of religion.

The painting is oriented horizontally, allowing the artist to insert more figures into the picture. A group of men and women wear historical garments and feast in an orchard. A manor can be spotted on the far left side of the picture. Feast attendants partake in simple pleasures, such as imbibing alcohol, and more cultured ones, such as playing chess or a lute. The founder of the Babin Republic, Stanisław Pszonka, stands in the centre of the picture. Some of the figures he is surrounded by were later identified by Leon Piccard and Andrzej Pruszyński, who produced a supplementary lithography with name attributions in 1881.

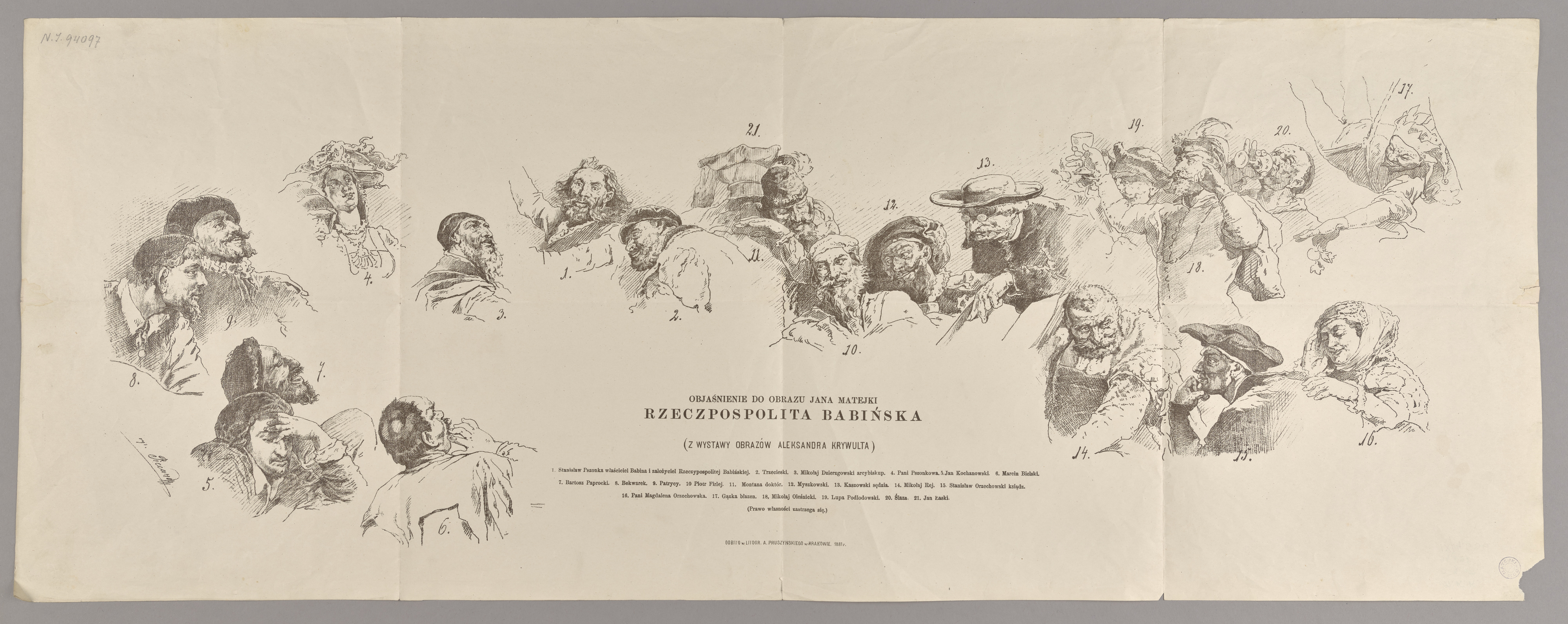
Leon Piccard, Andrzej Pruszyński, Explanation for the painting "The Babin Republic" by Jan Matejko, 1881, National Museum in Kraków

== See also ==
Art in Poland
