= Stanisław Pszonka =

Janina Crest

Stanisław Pszonka (Babiński; c.1511 - 1580) of the Janina heraldic family from Babin, Poland was a Lublin judge. Between 1550 and 1560 he founded the Babin Republic (a satirical, literary, and carnival society) with Piotr Kaszowski and served as its burgrave.

In March 1596 Pszonka took part in the synod at Bełżyce with Mikołaj Sienicki, chamberlain of Chełm; Adam Gorajski; and Piotr Kaszowski. In the reign of Zygmunt August, he was summoned to a public duel by Brzostowski, but did not appear.

After Stanisław Pszonka's death, his son Jakub Pszonka (1562-1622), a leader of the Zebrzydowski Rebellion, took over Babin and became its burgrave. At his death, the Babin Republic passed to Jakub's son Adam Pszonka - chorąży of Chełm and later chamberlain of Lublin. Adam's death in 1677 brought about the end of the Babin Republic.

According to the historian and Calvinist polemicist Stanisław Sarnicki, members of the Babin Republic - called "Babinianie" - included Jan Kochanowski, Mikołaj Rej, Stanisław Trzeciecki, Mikołaj Sęp Szarzyński, and Jan Achacy Kmita.

In 1837 Leonard Chodźko produced a steel engraving portrait of Stanisław Pszonka in his monumental La Pologne (Paris, 1836-1837). Other portraits include that by Jan Matejko in his oil painting of the Babin Republic, and the 1881 steel engraving by Antoni Oleszczyński, which appeared with the Variétés polonais publishing house.

An anonymous poet composed Pszonka's epitaph, which Sarnicki records as follows:

"Plurima si unquam debet Respublica Pszonkae.

Debet in hac viridi qui requiescit humo,

Namque sodalitinm sanxit fundamina cujus,

Conficti absque dole sunt fuerantque tales.

Cresce sodalitium, quod si tibi nostra probantur

Carmina, me graemio jungito quaeso tuo."

== Bibliography ==
- Adam Boniecki, Herbarz polski, Warszawa 1899 - 1914.
- Michałowska, Teresa; Otwinowska, Barbara; Sarnowska-Temeriusz, Elżbieta (2002), "Bronisław Nadolski, Cyprian Mielczarski, Dobrosława Platt Towarzystwa literackie i naukowe", Słownik literatury staropolskiej : średniowiecze, renesans, barok, Wrocław: Zakład Narodowy im. Ossolińskich - Wydaw.
- Kasper Niesiecki, Herbarz Polski, ed. J.N. Bobrowicz, Lipsk 1839-1845, Pszonka herbu Janina v. 7 p. 570 and in vol. III. p. 778 i 779
- Jan Dzięgielewski, Encyklopedia historii Polski: dzieje polityczne, Tom 2, Morex, 1995, p. 249
- Polski Słownik Biograficzny (v. 29 p. 286)
