= Simon Syrenius =

Polish botanist (1540–1611)

Simon Syrenius (Polish: Szymon Syreński) (1540–1611) was a pre-Linnean Polish botanist and academic. A native of Oświęcim, he taught at the Jagiellonian University. Anna Vasa served as his patron, and with her help, Syrenius published a botanic atlas in five volumes consisting of 1,540 pages describing 765 plants.

== Zielnik (Herbarium) ==
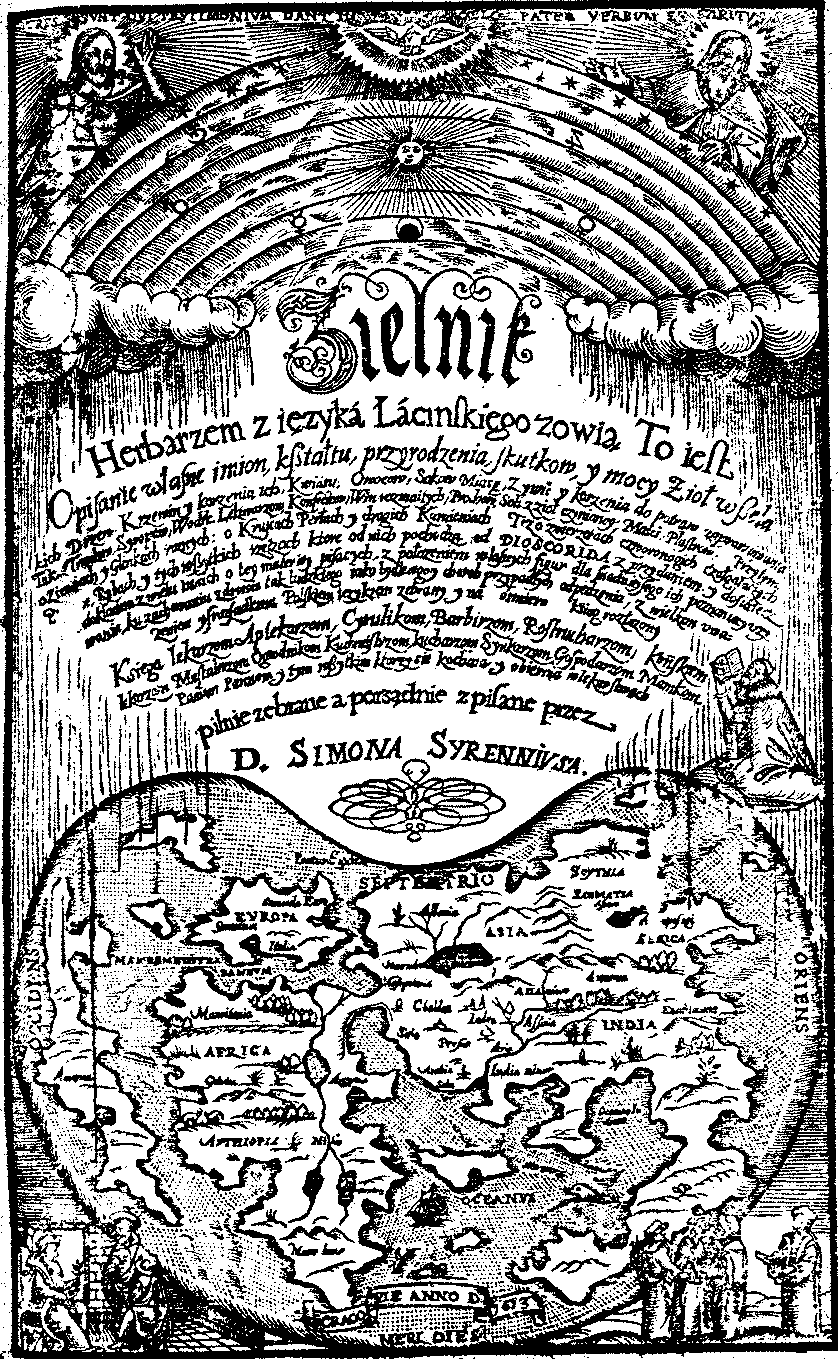
Title page of Syrenius' Zielnik (Cracow, 1613)

The first edition of Syrenius' botanical atlas was published by Bazyli Skalski in Cracow in 1613 under the title: Zielnik Herbarzem z ięzyka Łacinskiego zowią. To iest Opisanie własne imion, kształtu, przyrodzenia, skutkow, y mocy Zioł wszelakich Drzew, Krzewin y korzenia ich, Kwiátu, Owocow, Sokow Miasg, Zywic y korzenia do potraw zaprawowania. Tak Trunkow, Syropow, Wodek, Likworzow, Konfitor, Win rozmaitych, Prochow, Soli z zioł czynioney; Maści, Plastrow. Przytym o Ziomach y Glinkach rożnych: o Kruscach Perłach y drogich Kamieniach. Tez o zwierzetach czworonogich, czołgających Ptastwie, Rybach y tych wszystkich rzeczach ktore od nich pochodzą od DIOSCORIDA z przydaniem y dostatecznym dokładem z wielu innich o tey materiey piszacych, z położeniem własnych figur dla snadnieyszego ich poznania a y używania ku zatrzymaniu zdrowia tak ludzkiego iako bydlecego y chorob przypadłych odpedzenia, z wielkiem uważaniem y rozsądkiem Polskiem iezykiem zebrany y na osmiero ksiąg rozłożony...

The Zielnik is an illustrated atlas of practical plants, which includes information about the most important known and used plants in central and southern Europe in the sixteenth century. The work describes 765 plants, primarily medicinal ones, and their usage in the home, in industry, and in veterinary medicine. The recipes explain how to prepare plant medicines and food, as well as methods of pest control, how to treat farm animals, etc. It also records old folk traditions related to flora. Most of these descriptions are accompanied by woodcuts illustrating both the flowering plant and its roots, and sometimes its fruit and seeds as well.

The Zielnik was widely cited by Polish horticulturalists until the nineteenth century. The work was also popular in Russia, as evidenced by seventeenth-century translations now preserved in the National Library of Russia in St. Petersburg.

=== Contents ===
The Zielnik includes the following sections:

- dedication by the publisher, Gabriel Joannicy to Queen Anna Vasa;
- poem titled "Do Czytelnika" [To the Reader] by Jan Achacy Kmita;
- register of medicines;
- the primary text of the atlas, in five books (pp. 1–1533);
- supplemental woodcuts (s. 1533-1535);
- text "O Żydach rzecz krótka," written partly by Syrenius and added to the Zielnik by the printer Skalski (s. 1536-1539);
- errata, under the title "Omyłki" (s. 1540);
- index of plant names in Latin, Polish, and German.

== Bibliography ==
- Briuchin, Władimir, and Alicja Zemanek. "Rękopisy rosyjskich przekładów Zielnika (1613) Syreniusza w Petersburgu." In Kwartalnik Nauki i Techniki 41, nos. 3-4 (1996), 189-195;
- Rostański, Krzysztof. "Szymon Syreniusz i jego dzieło." In Wiadomości Botaniczne 41, no. 2 (1997), 7-12;
- Słownik biologów polskich. [Dictionary of Polish Biologists.] Warsaw, 1987;
- Zemanek, Alicja. "Szymon Syreński (Syreniusz, Syrennius) (ok. 1540-1611). Przyrodnik, zielnikarz, lekarz." In Złota Księga Wydziału Biologii i Nauk o Ziemi, edited by Alicja Zemanek, vol. 1, pp. 27–36. Cracow, 2000;
- Zemanek, Alicja. "Z dziejów botaniki renesansu – padewskie inspiracje polskich zielnikarzy." In Kwartalnik Nauki i Techniki 41, no. 1 (1996), 31-58;
- Żurkowa, Renata. "Wokół Zielnika Szymona Syreniusza." In Rocznik Biblioteki PAN w Krakowie 30 (1985), 169-183;
- Żukow-Karczewski, Marek, Zielnik Szymona Syreńskiego (Szymon Syrenski's herbarium), "Aura" 1, 1993, 23-24.
