= Wólka Szczecka =

- Village
- Location within Poland
- Coordinates: 50°48′N 21°55′E
- Country: Poland
- Voivodeship: Lublin
- County: Kraśnik
- Gmina: Gościeradów
- Population: 170

Wólka Szczecka [ˈvulka ˈʂt͡ʂɛt͡ska] is a village in the administrative district of Gmina Gościeradów, within Kraśnik County, Lublin Voivodeship, in eastern Poland.

== History ==
On August 9, 1943, near Wólka Szczecka, a unit of the National Armed Forces disarmed and shot 25 members of the People's Guard and three peasants.

On February 2, 1944, Wólka Szczecka, together with the neighboring villages (Borów, Szczecyn, Łążek Zaklikowski, Łążek Chwałowski, Karasiówka), was pacified by a German expedition of several thousand men. SS and German police officers completely destroyed the village, murdering over 200 inhabitants, including approximately 50 women and 20 children. Over 200 buildings were burned down. According to other sources, 98 inhabitants of Wólka were murdered on February 2, 1944.

In the 1980s, most of the inhabitants moved to cities including Kraśnik, Stalowa Wola, and Radom.
