= Erazm Otwinowski =

Polish writer (1529–1614)

- Coat of arms: Gryf
- Born: 1529; Liśnik Duży
- Died: 1614 (aged 84–85); Liśnik Duży
- Noble family: Otwinowski

Erazm Otwinowski (1529–1614) was a Polish Renaissance poet, Calvinist and Socinian activist.

Born at Liśnik Duży, Poland to a noble family. He was sent as a boy to the Wiśnicz Castle where he received his early education. There he came in contact with Protestants. Later he served for a Polish magnate Stanisław Tęczyński (important propagator of Reformation in Poland) as secretary and diplomat. Tęczyński sent him with many diplomatic missions abroad (e.g. to Turkey, Sweden, and Denmark).

In 1555 Otwinowski adopted Calvinism, but after 1570 until his death became an ardent supporter of the nontrinitarian Polish Brethren Church. In 1564 he became famous because of his public “blasphemy” against the Catholic doctrine of Transubstantiation during the Corpus Christi procession in Lublin.

After Tęczyński’s death in 1561, Otwinowski returned to Poland for good, where he remained active as a humanist, theologian, and Renaissance poet. He wrote numerous Polish-language verse forms (many were lost afterwards) based on biblical, social, and erotic motives. He died in poverty in his estate in Liśnik Duży.

== Bibliography ==
- Piotr Wilczek, Erazm Otwinowski. Pisarz ariański, Gnome Books, Katowice, 1994
- Stanisław Tworek, Z dziejów powiatu kraśnickiego: Materiały z sesji naukowej. Z zagadnień reformacji w powiecie kraśnickim. - UMCS Lublin.
- Stanisław Kot, Erazm Otwinowski, poeta – dworzanin i pisarz różnowierczy [in:] „Reformacja w Polsce”, band 6.
