= Gmina Gościeradów =

Gmina Gościeradów Gościeradów Commune
- Gmina
- Coat of arms
- Interactive map of Gmina Gościeradów
- Coordinates (Gościeradów): 50°52′2″N 22°0′8″E
- Country: Poland
- Voivodeship: Lublin
- County: Kraśnik
- Seat: Gościeradów

Area
  - Total: 158.56 km^{2} (61.22 sq mi)

Population (2013)
  - Total: 7,400
  - Density: 47/km^{2} (120/sq mi)
- Website: https://web.archive.org/web/20050212095647/http://www.goscieradow.lubelskie.pl/

Gmina Gościeradów is a rural gmina (administrative district) in Kraśnik County, Lublin Voivodeship, in eastern Poland. Its seat is the village of Gościeradów, which lies approximately 17 kilometres (11 mi) west of Kraśnik and 59 km (37 mi) south-west of the regional capital Lublin.

The gmina covers an area of 158.56 square kilometres (61.2 sq mi), and as of 2006 its total population is 7,367 (7,400 in 2013).

== Villages ==
Gmina Gościeradów contains the villages and settlements of Aleksandrów, Gościeradów, Gościeradów Plebański, Gościeradów-Folwark, Gościeradów-Kolonia, Księżomierz, Księżomierz Gościeradowska, Księżomierz Kościelna, Księżomierz-Kolonia, Księżomierz-Osada, Łany, Liśnik Duży, Liśnik Duży-Kolonia, Marynopole, Mniszek, Salomin, Suchodoły, Szczecyn, Wólka Gościeradowska and Wólka Szczecka.

== Neighbouring gminas ==
Gmina Gościeradów is bordered by the gminas of Annopol, Dzierzkowice, Radomyśl nad Sanem, Trzydnik Duży and Zaklików.
