= Księżomierz Kościelna =

- Village
- Location within Poland
- Coordinates: 50°54′49″N 21°58′28″E
- Country: Poland
- Voivodeship: Lublin
- County: Kraśnik
- Gmina: Gościeradów

Księżomierz Kościelna [kɕɛ̃ˈʐɔmjɛʂ kɔɕˈt͡ɕɛlna] is a village in the administrative district of Gmina Gościeradów, within Kraśnik County, Lublin Voivodeship, in eastern Poland.
