= Jan Achacy Kmita =

Polish poet and translator

Jan Achacy Kmita (died 27 August 1624 or sometime in 1628) was a Polish poet and translator from Bochnia.

Kmita translated Virgil's Aeneid and Eclogues (1591, 1588) and was particularly well known for his funerary poetry, including Treny na Śmierć Katarzyny Barnickiey Starościny Niepołomickiey (Cracow, 1588) and Łów Dyjanny (1588). His other writings included Żywoty Królów polskich (1591); Spitamegeranomachia (1595), a mock-heroic work about the wars of Stefan Batory; and a prefatory poem in Simon Syrenius's Zielnik (1613).

Kmita served in Stefan Bathory's Livonian Wars, and later in life was a member of the Babin Republic.

In addition to his literary activities, Kmita served as podżupnik (administrator) of the Bochnia Salt Mine.

== Works ==
=== Antisemitic writings ===
- Seper = Ein send Breief, abo list od Zydow Polskich, Po Messyasza: Ktory iako Zydzi wierzą w Raiu siedzi, czekaiąc czasu przyścia swego. Cracow(?), 1601.
- Proces sprawy Bocheńskiey. 1610.
- Talmud Abo Wiara Zydowska. Cracow: 1610; Lublin: Anna Konradowa, 1642.
- Ierycho Nowe. 1615.
- Akatergaston To iest Vtracenie ozdoby Ciała żywego Zacnie Vrodzonego Pana Spytka Stanisława Faliboga z Ianowic... Cracow, after 10 March 1622.
- Peszach Hoc est Pascha Siue Transitus a Vitiis Ad Summos Apices Virtutem et Religionem. 1623.
- Kruk w złotey klatce abo Żydzi w świebodney wolności Korony Polskiey. 2nd ed., Cracow, 1648.

=== Poetry ===
Funerary poetry

- Łów Dyjanny. Cracow: Mikołaj Scharffenberg, 1588.
  - A paraphrase of Ad Ascanium cardinalem S. Viti Venatio by Adrian da Corneto (1505).
- Threny na smierć jey mości Paniey Katarzyny Branickiey, Starościney Niepołomskiey &c. Cracow(?): Mikołaj Scharffenberg(?), after 8 October 1588.
- Treny bardzo smutne na zeszcie z tego świata .. pana imei książęcia Janusza Zbaraskiego, wojewody bracławskiego, starosty krzemienieckiego. Cracow, 1608.
- Treny bardzo smutne na pogrzebie Anny Mińskiej. Cracow, 1609.
- Salicernium na pogrzeb Pawła Czernego z Wilowie. Cracow, 1610.
- Apotheosis starożytney familiey nieboszczyka Swięey Pamięi księdza Woyciecha Szydłowskiego... Cracow: Bazyli Skalski, 1617.
- Osculum mortis praeclara nobilitate. Cracow, 1621.
  - For the death of Krzysztof z Bogoryi Podłeski.
- Monodia abo pocałowanie śmierci. Cracow, 1622.
  - For the death of Helżbieta of Sienna.
- Threny na śmierć syna Jana Chwaliboga, rotmisztrza powiatowego. Cracow, 1624.

Other poems

- Jana Szemeta Trymachia. Cracow: drukarnia Łazarzowa, 1584.
- Psalma przyjazdu szcześliwego... Zygmunta Trzeciego. Kraków, 1587.
  - Dedicated to Olbracht Łaski, Palatine of Sieradz.
- Spitamegeranomachia. 1595. Repr. in Biblioteka pisarzów polskich. Cracow, 1897.
- ...S.R.M. Simbola officialium [et] officiorum famulorumq[ue] zupp[a]e Bochnen[sis] nec non regum [et] zuppariorum inclutorum non null[a]e antiquitates. Cracow: Szymon Kempini, 1605.
- Fenix poema. Cracow, 1609.
- Monogamia Iego Mosci Pana Mikołaia Stradomskiego, y [...] Katharzyny Pszomkowny [...] Iakvba Pszomki [...] Corki. Cracow, 1617.
  - Includes Morocosmea Babińskie and Epitaphium D. Psomkae fundatoris Soc. Babinensis.

=== Translations ===
- Virgil. Pasterskie Publiusza Wergiliusza Marona rozmowy (Eclogues). Cracow, 1588.
  - Dedicated to Grzegorz Branicki z Branic, starosta of Niepołomice.
- Maffeo Vegio. O Eneaszu Trojańskim księgi trzynaste. Cracow, 1591. Repr. in Biblioteka pisarzów polskich. Cracow, 1897.
- Penelopea, abo niewinność cudowney niewiasty. 1610. Repr. in Biblioteka pisarzów polskich. Cracow, 1897.
- Symaryjusz przypowieści Salomonowych skomplikowany. Cracow, 1622; Cracow: drukarnia u Alexandra Dynowskiego, 1630.
- Żywoty królów polskich. Cracow: Mikołaj Scharffenberg, 1591.
  - Translation of Klemens Janicki's Vitae regum Polonorum (1563).

=== Other works ===
- Summaryjusz przypowieści Salomonowych zkompilowany. Cracow: u Sebastyjana Tabrowica, 1622; 2nd. ed., Cracow: u Alexandra Dymowskiego, 1630.
- O Confederaciey Lwowskiey w Roku 1622 uczynioney nauka za Pozwoleniem Urzędowym Wydana: Multis Simul Criminibus Obruitur qui Contra Patriam Peccat: Impietate, Ingratudine, Ciuium Perturbatione, Ac Matricidi. Cracow: Franciszek Cezary, after 1622. Repr. 1858.
- Poczatki Krolow Rzymskich. Cracow: drukarnia Łazarzowa, n.d.
- Obyczaje tureckie i sposoby ich pożycia, przez sławnego niegdyś i nieszczęśliwego pielgrzyma jerozolimskiego Bartłmieja Jurgiewicza opisane... Cracow, n.d.
- Zwierciadło korony polskiej. n.d.
