= Skalski =

Skalski (feminine: Skalska) is a Polish surname. Notable people with the surname include:

- Andrzej W. Skalski (1938–1996), Polish entomologist
- Bazyli Skalski, Polish printer and publisher
- Hanna Skalska-Szemioth (1921–1964), Polish composer, journalist and music educator
- Isabelle Skalski (born c. 1981), Canadian politician
- James Skalski (born 1998), American football player
- Jan Skalski, Bohemian military commander
- Joe Skalski (born 1964), American baseball player
- Mary Jane Skalski, American film producer
- Stanisław Skalski (1915–2004), Polish fighter ace
