= Księżomierz Gościeradowska =

- Village
- Location within Poland
- Coordinates: 50°54′28″N 21°59′32″E
- Country: Poland
- Voivodeship: Lublin
- County: Kraśnik
- Gmina: Gościeradów

Księżomierz Gościeradowska (Polish pronunciation: [kɕɛ̃ˈʐɔmjɛʐ ɡɔɕt͡ɕɛraˈdɔfska]) is a village in the administrative district of Gmina Gościeradów, within Kraśnik County, Lublin Voivodeship, in eastern Poland.
