= Mikołaj Mielecki =

Polish nobleman and politician (c. 1540 – 1585)

Mikołaj Mielecki h. Gryf (c. 1540 – 11 May 1585 in Kraków) was a Polish nobleman and politician. He was the voivod of Podolian Voivodship from 1569, and he also served in the Polish Army as Grand Hetman of the Crown from 1578 to 1580.

== Biography ==
One of the most notable partisans of the Habsburg faction in Poland, since 1562 he took part in various military campaigns to Moldavia under the command of Mikołaj Sieniawski. In 1579 he was the commander of all Polish armies in the war against the Russian tsar Ivan the Terrible. One of his most astonishing successes was capturing the city and the stronghold of Połock. In 1579 he took the city of Sokol, burning it and executing its defenders. Following various disagreements with Stefan Batory and Jan Zamoyski, he resigned his posts and retired from public life.

Initially a lukewarm Calvinist and a member of the Polish Reformed Church, in the late 1570s he converted to Catholicism, with his wife and children following him a few years later.

== Marriage and issue ==
Mikołaj married Elżbieta Radziwiłł, the daughter of Hetman Mikołaj Czarny Radziwiłł in 1566 and had two children:

- Zofia Mielecka (1566-1619), married to Prince Szymon Olelkowicz Słucki and later to Hetman Jan Karol Chodkiewicz;
- Katarzyna Mielecka (born ca. 1568), married to Jan Ostroróg, voivode of Poznań.

== Bibliography ==
- Jan Łasicki. Historia de ingressu Polonorum in Valachiam cum Bogdano Voivoda et caede Turcarum: ducibus Nicolao Mielecio et Nicolao Sieniawscio: A. 1572
- Ryszard Przybyliński. Hetman wielki koronny Mikołaj Mielecki (ok. 1540-1585). Toruń 2002. ISBN 83-7322-064-X
- Marcin Spórna. Słownik najsłynniejszych wodzów i dowódców polskich. Kraków 2006. ISBN 83-7435-094-6
