= Chomsky (surname) =

Chomsky (Polish: Chomski, Belarusian: Хомскі, Russian: Хомский, Ukrainian: Хомський, Hebrew: חומסקי, "from (Vyoska) Chomsk/ Khomsk (nearby Brest, now Belarus)") is a surname of Slavic origin. Notable people with the surname include:

- Alejandro Chomski (born 1968), Argentine film director and screenwriter
- Aviva Chomsky (born 1957), American historian
- Carol (Schatz) Chomsky (1930–2008), American linguist, wife of Noam
- Judith Chomsky (born 1942), American human rights lawyer and co-founder of the Juvenile Law Center
- Marvin J. Chomsky (1929–2022), American television and film director
- Noam Chomsky (born 1928), American linguist and political activist
- Stanisław Chomski (born 1957), Polish speedway rider and coach
- William Chomsky (1896–1977), American scholar of Hebrew
- Pavel Osipovich Khomsky (1925–2016), Soviet and Russian theater director

== See also ==
- Gryf coat of arms
- Odrowąż coat of arms
