= Gościeradów Plebański =

- Village
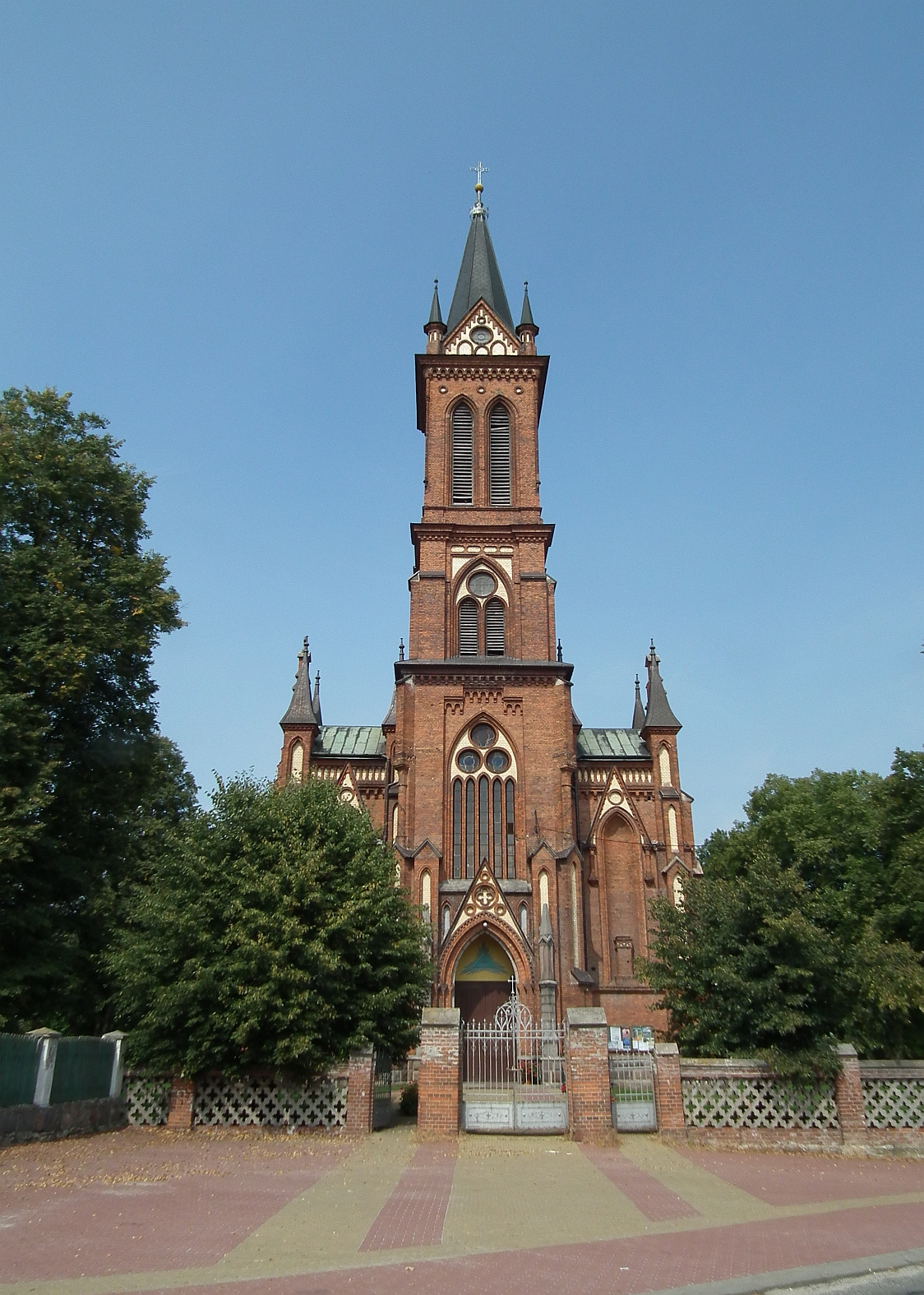
- Saint Stanislaus church in Gościeradów Plebański

- Location within Poland
- Coordinates: 50°52′N 21°59′E
- Country: Poland
- Voivodeship: Lublin
- County: Kraśnik
- Gmina: Gościeradów
- Time zone: UTC+1 (CET)
  - Summer (DST): UTC+2 (CEST)

Gościeradów Plebański (Polish pronunciation: [ɡɔɕt͡ɕɛˈraduf plɛˈbaj̃skʲi]) is a village in the administrative district of Gmina Gościeradów, within Kraśnik County, Lublin Voivodeship, in eastern Poland.

== History ==
Four Polish citizens were murdered by Nazi Germany in the village during World War II.
