= Gościeradów-Folwark =

- Village
- Location within Poland
- Coordinates: 50°51′59″N 21°57′38″E
- Country: Poland
- Voivodeship: Lublin
- County: Kraśnik
- Gmina: Gościeradów

Gościeradów-Folwark (Polish pronunciation: [ɡɔɕt͡ɕɛˈraduf ˈfɔlvark]) is a village in the administrative district of Gmina Gościeradów, within Kraśnik County, Lublin Voivodeship, in eastern Poland.
