= Wólka Gościeradowska =

- Village
- Location within Poland
- Coordinates: 50°52′N 22°2′E
- Country: Poland
- Voivodeship: Lublin
- County: Kraśnik
- Gmina: Gościeradów

Wólka Gościeradowska (Polish pronunciation: [ˈvulka ɡɔɕt͡ɕɛraˈdɔfska]) is a village in the administrative district of Gmina Gościeradów, within Kraśnik County, Lublin Voivodeship, in eastern Poland.
