= Liśnik Duży-Kolonia =

- Village
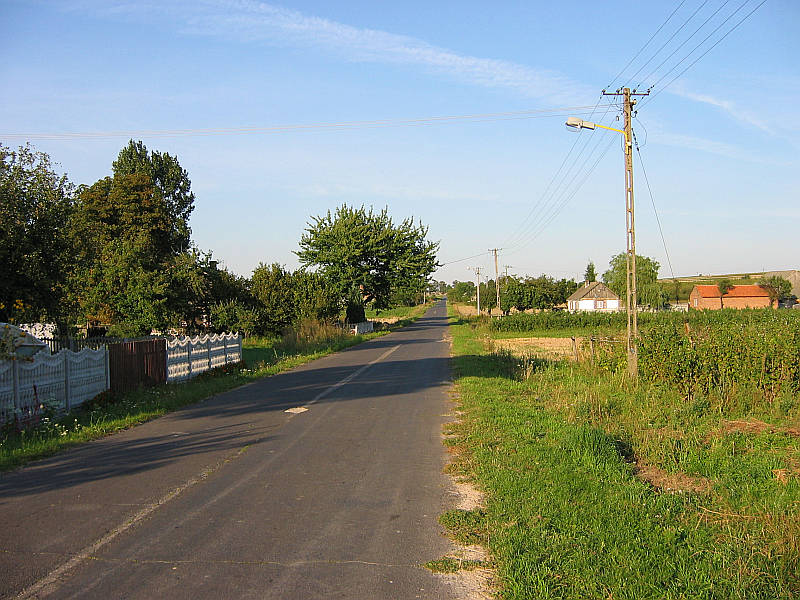
- Street of Liśnik Duży-Kolonia

- Location within Poland
- Coordinates: 50°52′13″N 22°3′21″E
- Country: Poland
- Voivodeship: Lublin
- County: Kraśnik
- Gmina: Gościeradów

Liśnik Duży-Kolonia [ˈliɕnik ˈduʐɨ kɔˈlɔɲa] is a village in the administrative district of Gmina Gościeradów, within Kraśnik County, Lublin Voivodeship, in eastern Poland.
