= Łany, Kraśnik County =

Łany
- Village
- Location within Poland
- Coordinates: 50°50′31″N 21°57′46″E
- Country: Poland
- Voivodeship: Lublin
- County: Kraśnik
- Gmina: Gościeradów

Łany [ˈwanɨ] is a village in the administrative district of Gmina Gościeradów, within Kraśnik County, Lublin Voivodeship, in eastern Poland.
