= Aleksandrów, Kraśnik County =

Aleksandrów
- Village
- Location within Poland
- Coordinates: 50°56′N 21°58′E
- Country: Poland
- Voivodeship: Lublin
- County: Kraśnik
- Gmina: Gościeradów

Aleksandrów [alɛkˈsandruf] is a village in the administrative district of Gmina Gościeradów, within Kraśnik County, Lublin Voivodeship, in eastern Poland.
