= Branicki (Gryf) =

Gryf coat of arms of the Branicki family

The House of Branicki (plural: Braniccy) was a Polish noble and aristocratic (szlachta) family, whose symbol was the griffin. Since Polish adjectives have different forms for the genders, Branicka is the form for a female family member.

== History ==
The Branicki family, also called the "Griffin Clan" (Gryfici), was a magnate family, originating from Branice and Ruszcza in the Kraków Voivodeship. One of the most prominent members of the family was Field and Great Crown Hetman Jan Klemens Gryf Branicki. Jan was one of the most powerful and influential magnates in Poland during the 18th century. He was the owner of 12 cities, 257 villages, 17 palaces and two primeval forests.

In 1726, he built the Branicki Palace, the "Versailles of Podlasie". He also laid out the central part of the town of Białystok with its triangular market. He started in the King's election of 1763–1764, but was beaten by his brother-in-law, Stanisław Poniatowski.

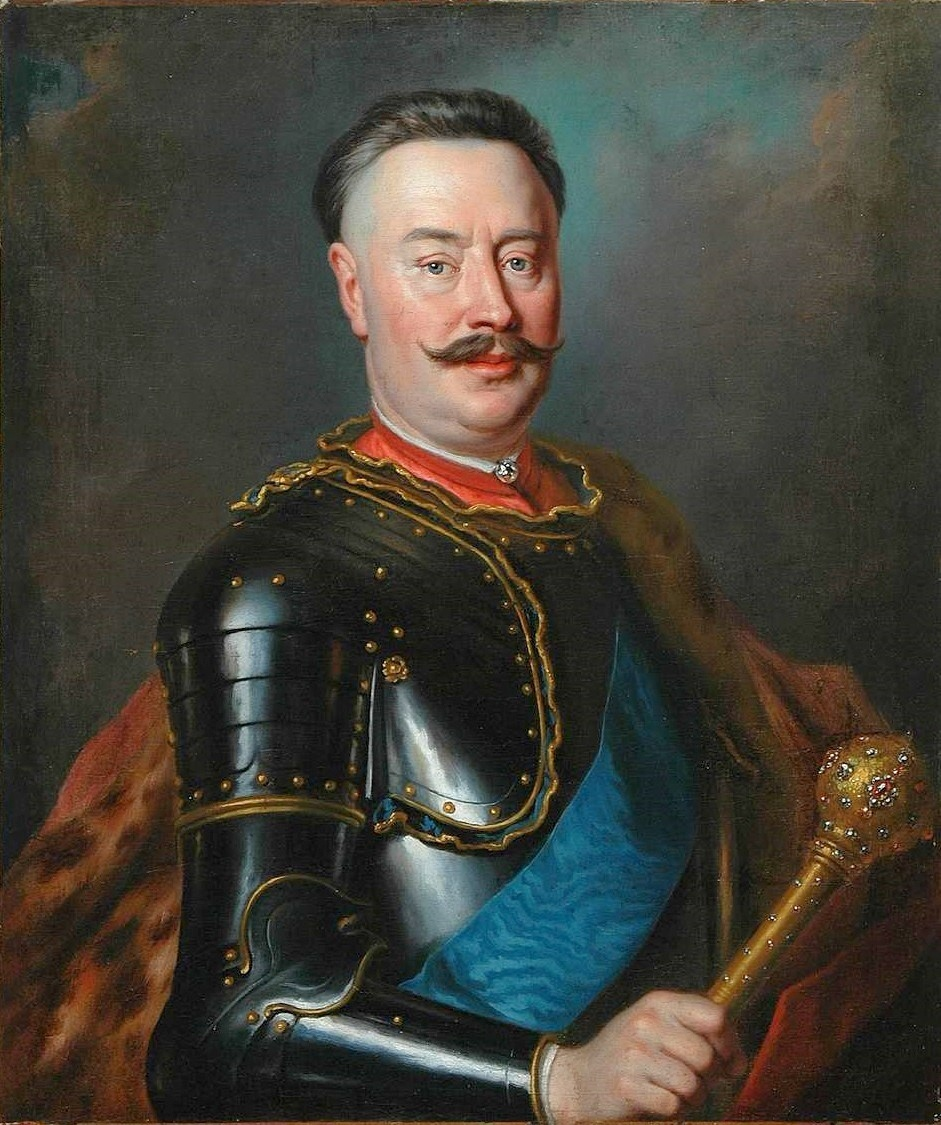
Jan Klemens Branicki, by painter Louis de Silvestre

== Coat of arms ==
The Branicki family used the Gryf coat of arms.

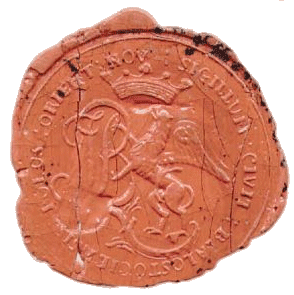
Seal of Białystok used by Izabela Branicka after the death of Jan Klemens Branicki with the initials IB and the Griffin (beginning of the 18th century).

Coat of arms of Choroszcz with the Griffin and Ciołek of Izabela Branicka née Poniatowska

Former coat of arms of Choroszcz with the initials KB (Jan Klemens Branicki) and the Griffin

== Notable members ==
- Grzegorz Branicki (1534−1595), Master of the Hunt, Burgrave of Kraków, married Katarzyna Kotwicz h. Kotwicz
  - Jan Branicki (c. 1568−1612), courtier, Łowczy of Kraków, castellan of Żarnów, married Anna Myszkowska h. Jastrzębiec
  - Stanisław Branicki (1474-1520), Swordbearer of the Crown, married Helena Tarło h. Topór, daughter of Jan Tarło h. Topór
    - Jan Klemens Branicki (died 1657), podkomorzy (chamberlain) of Kraków, married Anna Beata Wapowska h. Nieczuja
      - Jan Klemens Branicki (c. 1624−1673), Court Marshall of the Crown, married Aleksandra Katarzyna Czarniecka h. Łodzia, daughter of Hetman Stefan Czarniecki h. Łodzia
        - Stefan Mikołaj Branicki (1640–1709), Great Stolnik of the Crown, Voivode of Podlasie, married Princes Katarzyna Scholastyka Sapieha h. Lis, daughter of Hetman Prince Jan Kazimierz Sapieha h. Lis
          - Jan Klemens Branicki (1689–1771), Field and Great Crown Hetman, the last male representative of the Branicki of the Gryf line. He married firstly Princess Katarzyna Barbara Radziwiłł h. Trąby, granddaughter of Hetman Michał Kazimierz Radziwiłł, secondly Barbara Szembek and thirdly Princess Izabella Poniatowska h. Ciołek, sister of King Stanisław August Poniatowski
        - Konstancja Tekla Branicka (1658–1720), married to Johann Heinrich von Altenbockum, mother of Ursula Katharina Lubomirska.
  - Anna Branicka (died 1639), married to Count Sebastian Lubomirski.
  - Jennah Karthes de Branicka (1982-), a German actress and singer.

== Palaces ==
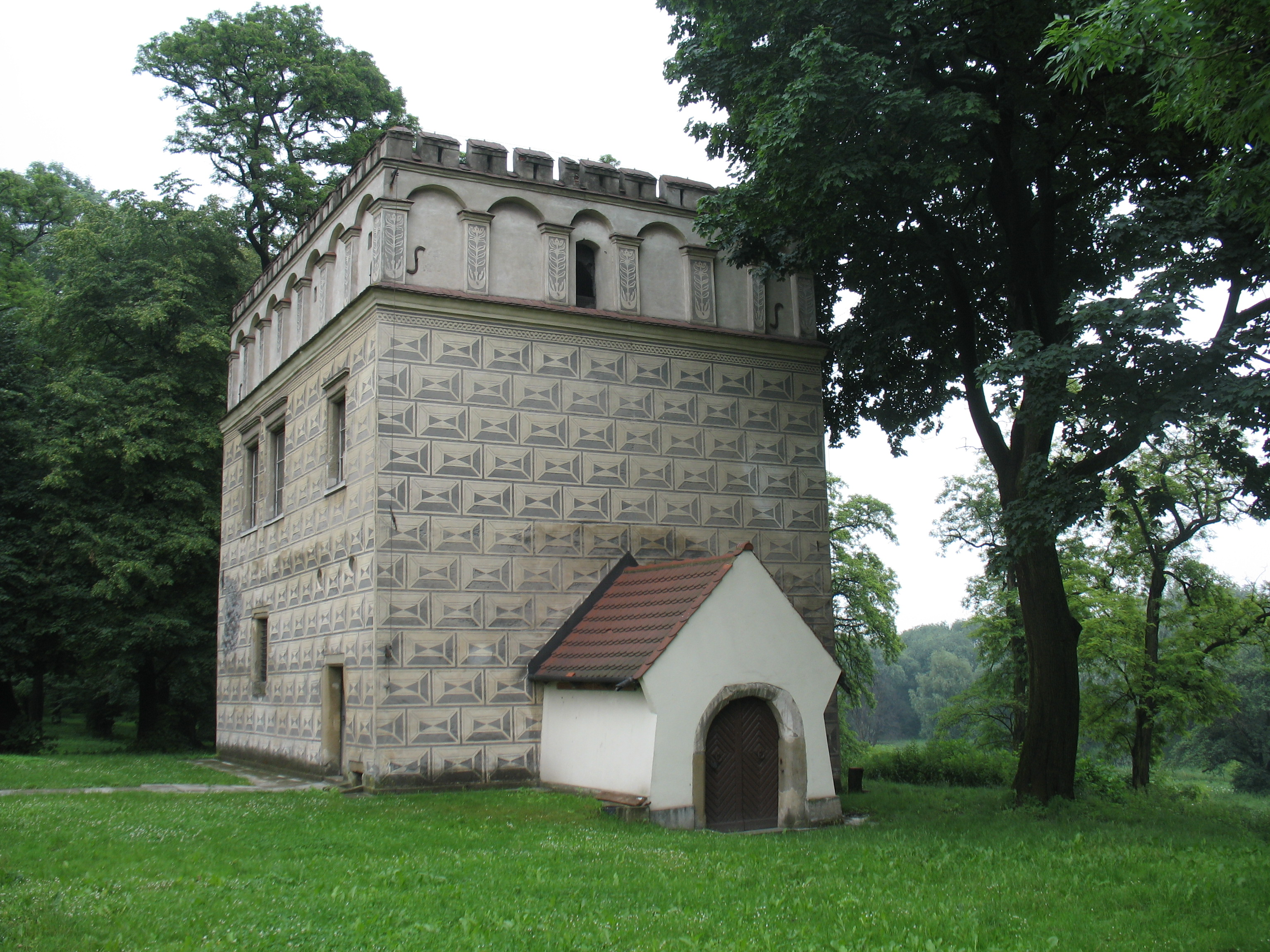
Renaissance manor house in Branice

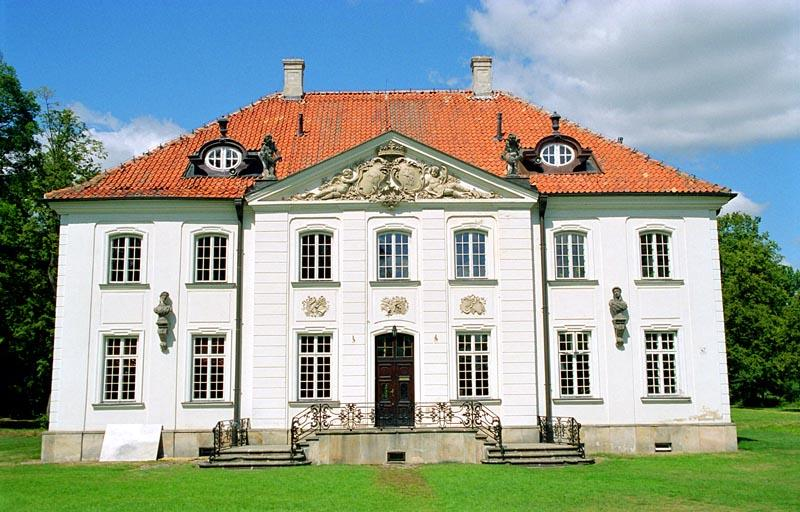
Manor house in Choroszcz

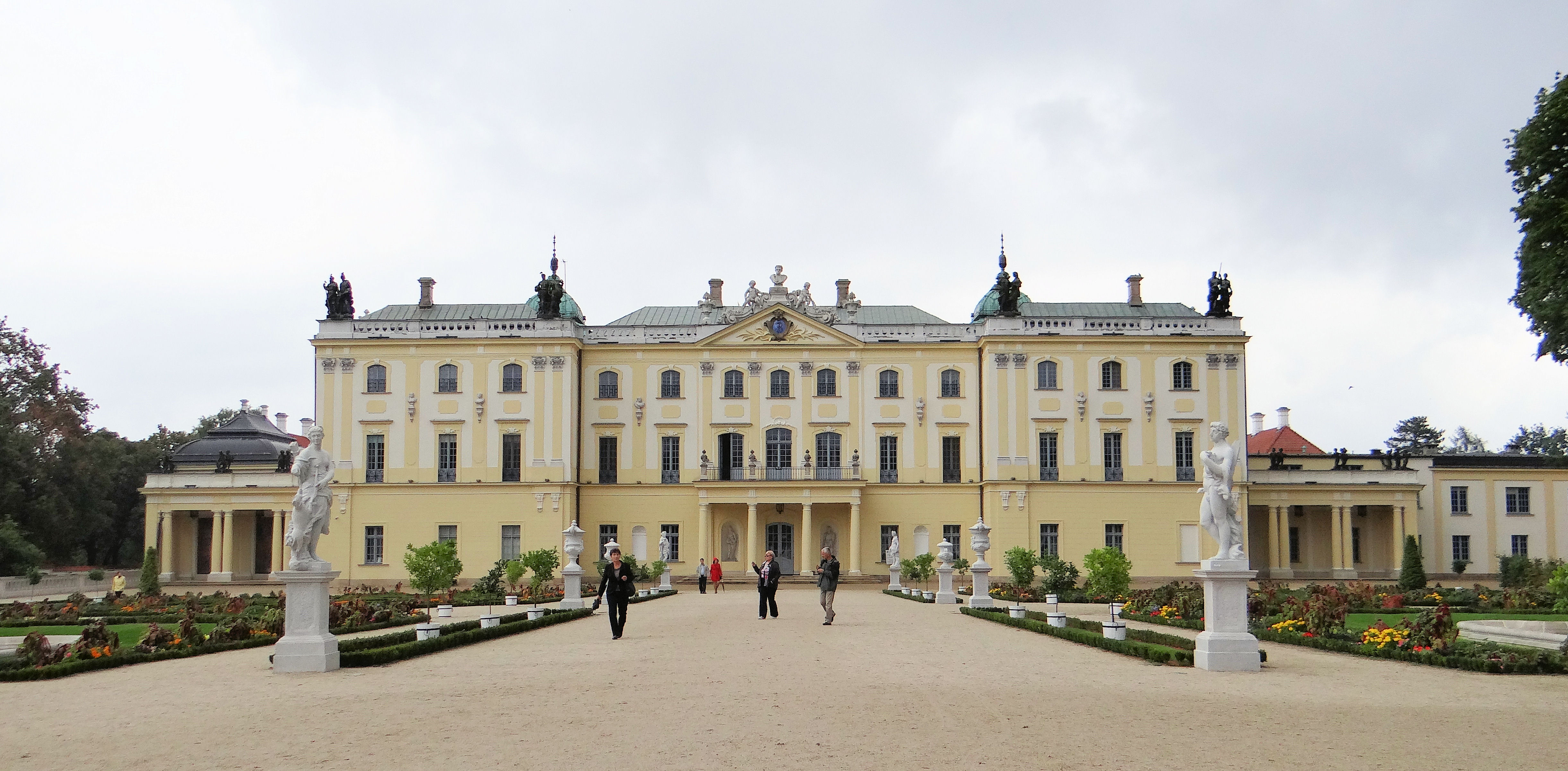
Palace in Białystok

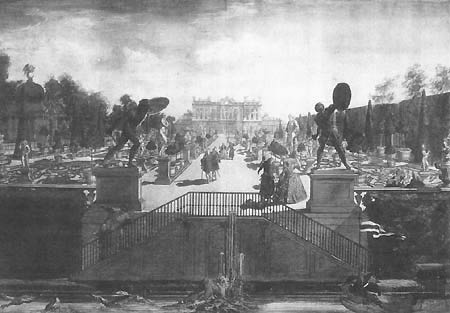
Branicki Palace in Białystok (1752)

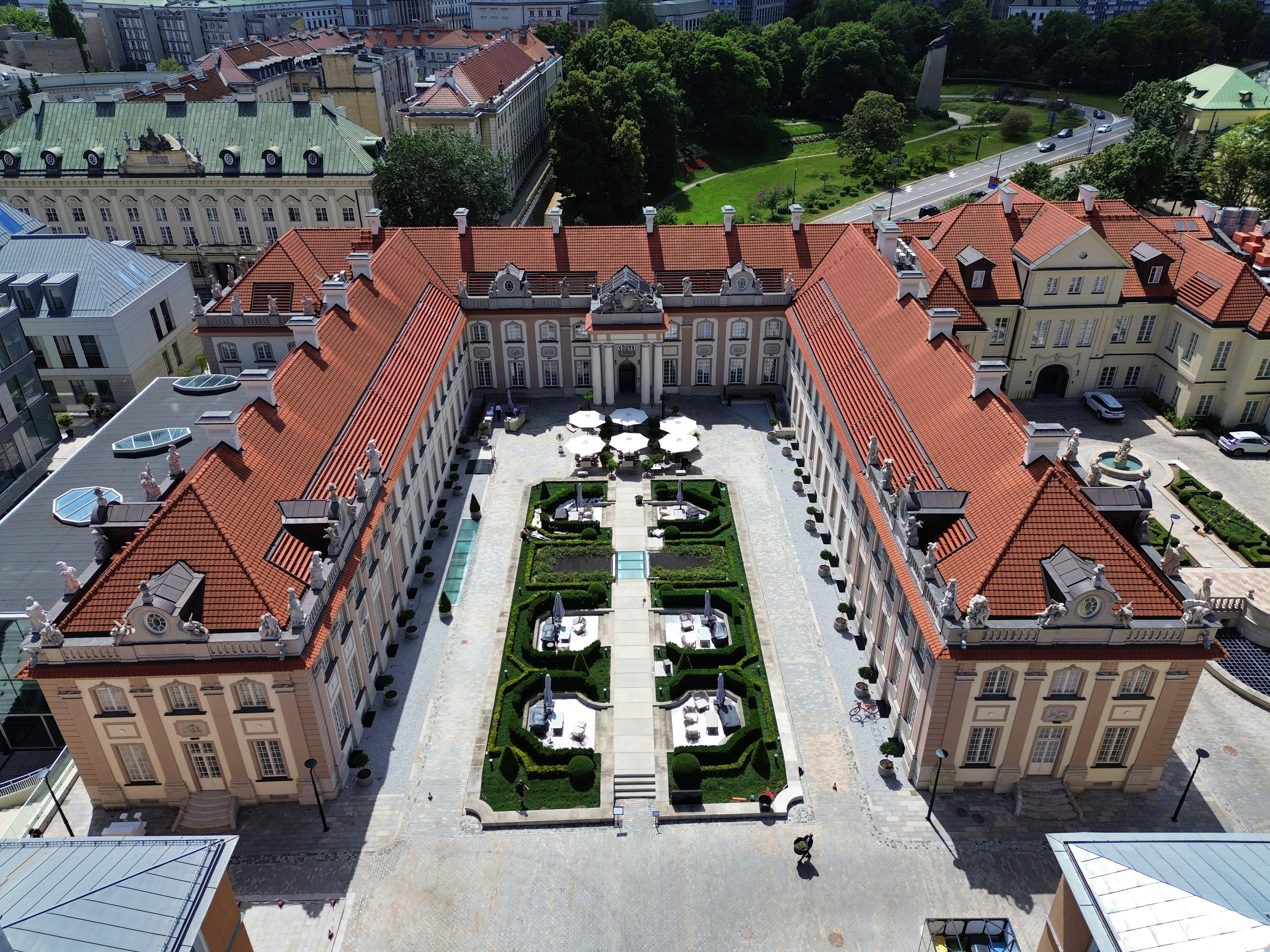
Branicki Palace in Warsaw

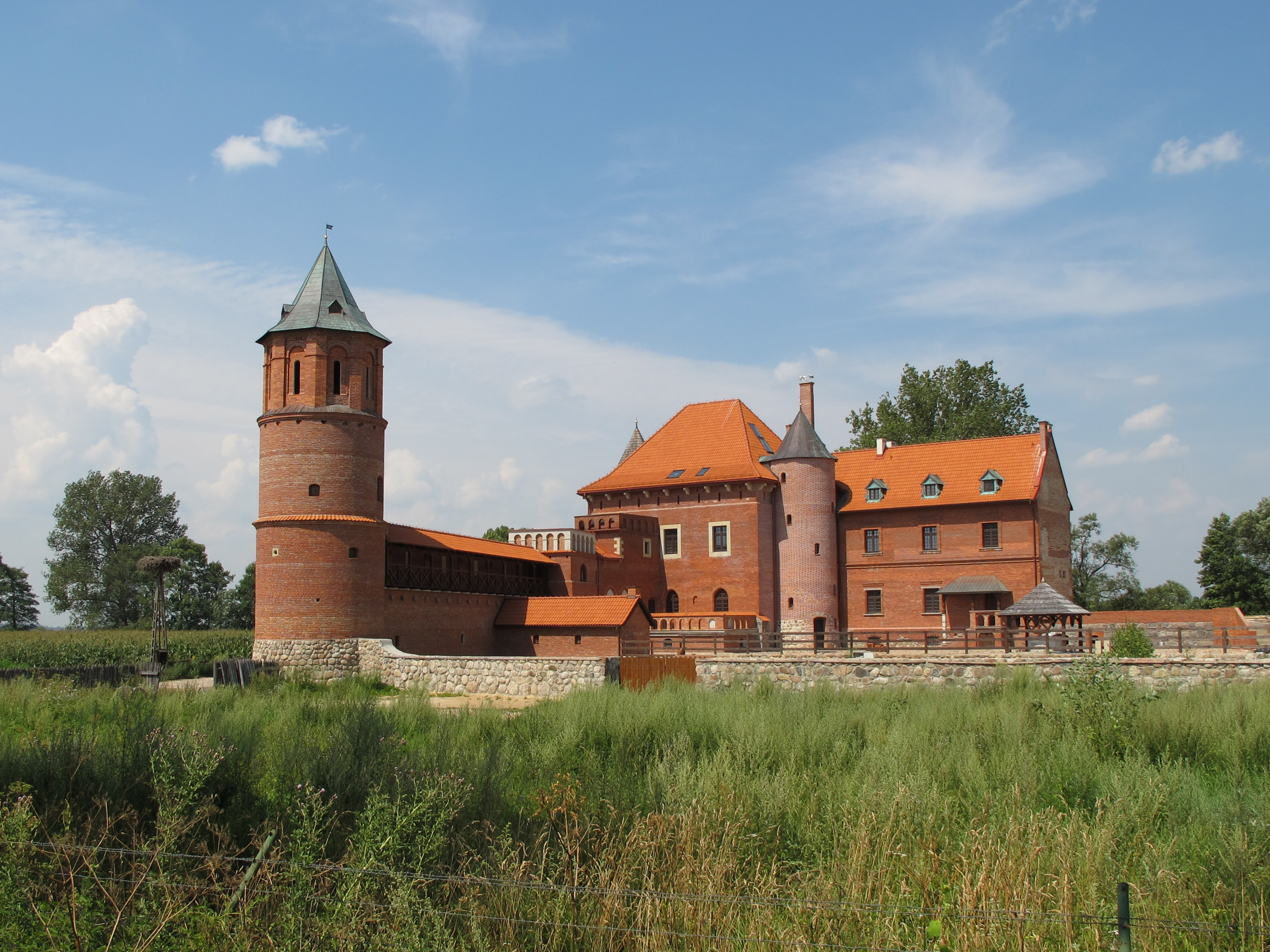
Tykocin Castle

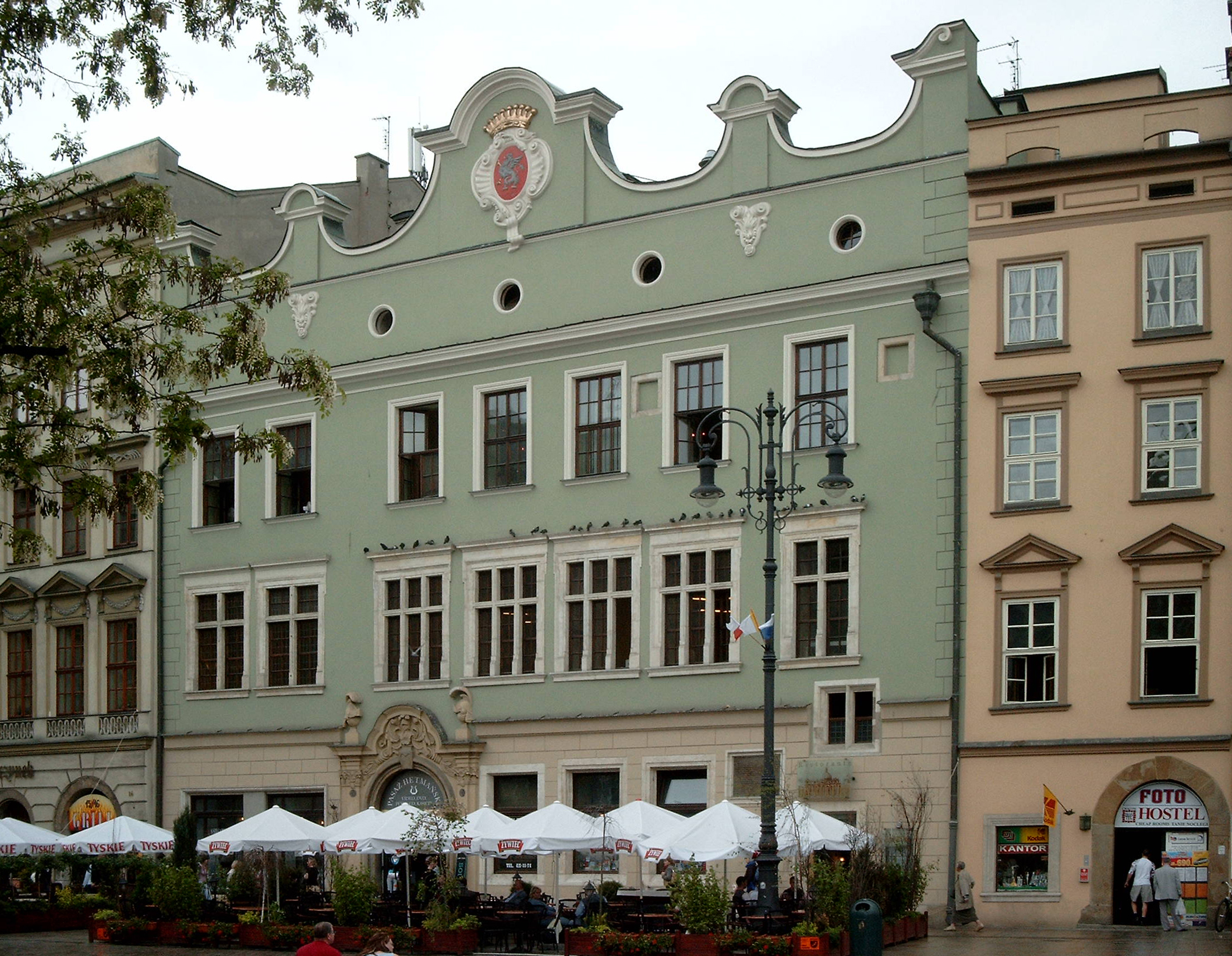
The "Hetman" tenement house in Kraków (with the Gryf arms on the top)

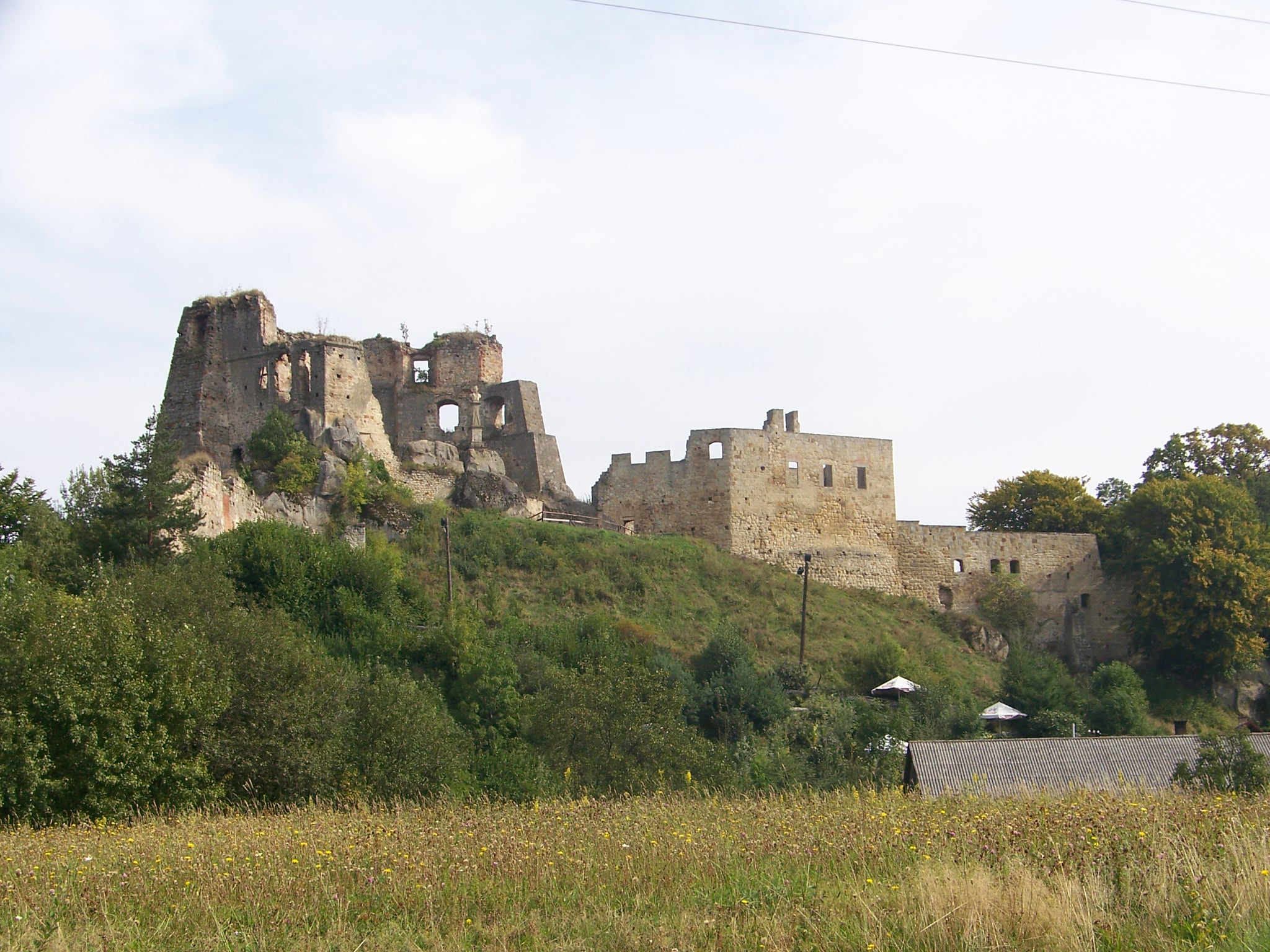
Ruins of the Kamieniec Castle near Korczyna
