= Gościeradów =

- Village
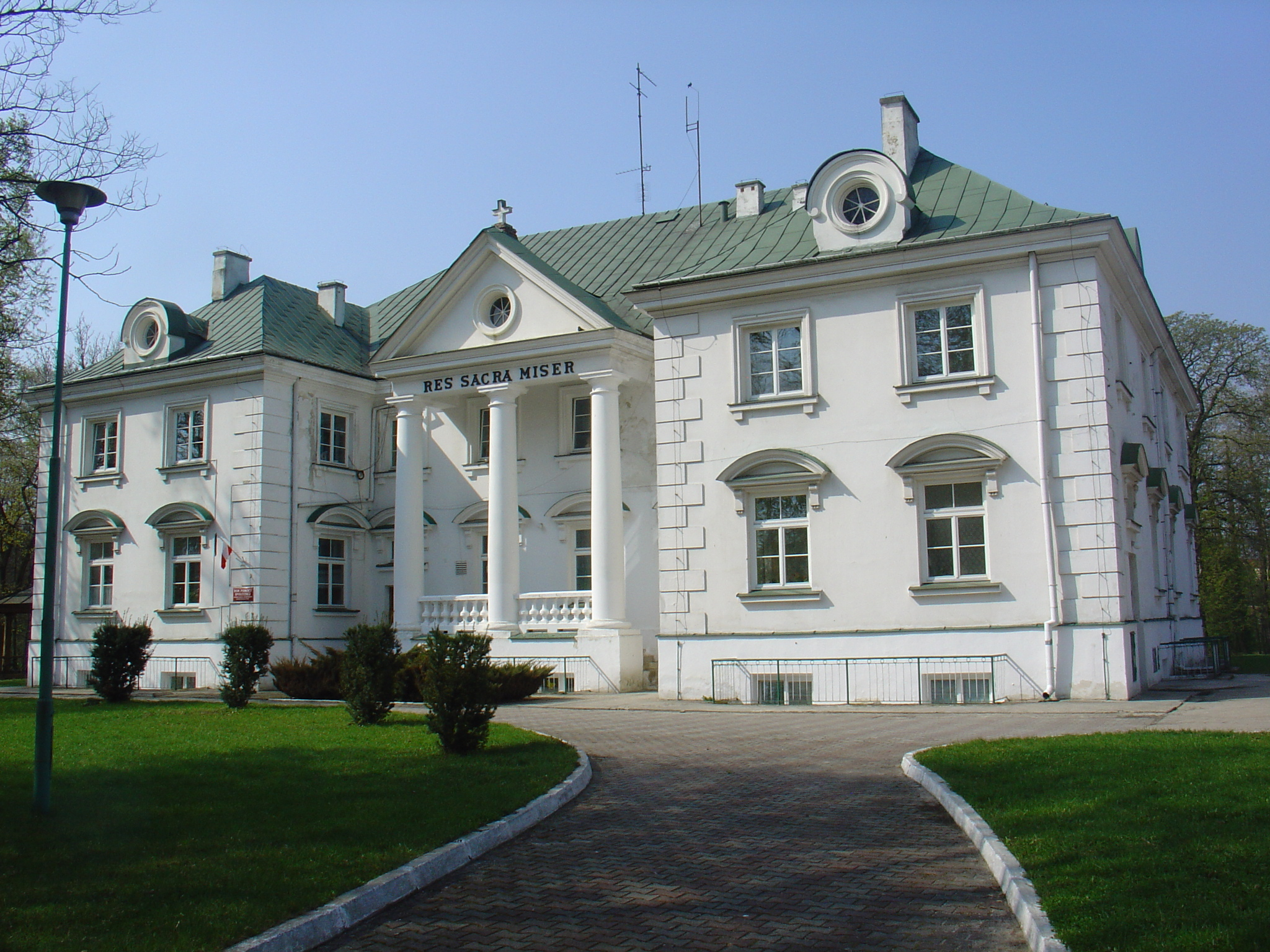
- Palace in Gościeradów

- Location within Poland
- Coordinates: 50°52′2″N 22°0′8″E
- Country: Poland
- Voivodeship: Lublin
- County: Kraśnik
- Gmina: Gościeradów

Population
  - Total: 960
- Time zone: UTC+1 (CET)
  - Summer (DST): UTC+2 (CEST)
- Vehicle registration: LKR

Gościeradów (Polish pronunciation: [ɡɔɕt͡ɕɛˈraduf]) is a village in Kraśnik County, Lublin Voivodeship, in eastern Poland. It is the seat of the gmina (administrative district) called Gmina Gościeradów.
