= Księżomierz =

- Village
- Location within Poland
- Coordinates: 50°54′N 21°59′E
- Country: Poland
- Voivodeship: Lublin
- County: Kraśnik
- Gmina: Gościeradów
- Time zone: UTC+1 (CET)
  - Summer (DST): UTC+2 (CEST)

Księżomierz [kɕɛ̃ˈʐɔmjɛʂ] is a village in the administrative district of Gmina Gościeradów, within Kraśnik County, Lublin Voivodeship, in eastern Poland.

== History ==
Following the German-Soviet invasion of Poland, which started World War II in September 1939, it was occupied by Germany until 1944. On 15 March 1942 the Germans pacified the village. They killed a dozen or so persons and burnt buildings.
