= Mielecki =

Polish family of knights

Gryf coat of arms of the Mielecki family

Mielecki (plural: Mieleccy, feminine form: Mielecka) was a family of knights, a branch of the Gryffin Clan. The founders and former owners of the City of Mielec.

== History ==
It is believed that their progenitor could be Pawlik z Mielec, mentioned in 1224. The first documented ancestor was Jakub Trestka, castellan of Brzesc in 1334. The Mielecki of Gryf family line died out in 1771.

== Notable members ==
- Stanislaw z Mielca, Royal Rotmistrz, castellan of Połaniec, married Elżbieta Tęczyńska h. Topór
  - Jan Mielecki, Grand Marshal of the Crown, married Anna Koła h. Junosza
    - Mikołaj Mielecki, Voivode of Podole and Grand Hetman of the Crown, married Elżbieta Radziwiłł h. Trąby
      - Zofia Mielecka, married Prince Szymon Olelkowicz Słucki h. Pogoń Litewska and Hetman Jan Karol Chodkiewicz h. Kościesza

== Coat of arms ==
The family used the Gryf coat of arms.

== Bibliography ==
- Rodzina, herbarz szlachty polskiej, t. XI, Warszawa 1914
