= Grzegorz Branicki =

- Coat of arms: Gryf
- Born: c. 1534
- Died: 1595
- Family: Branicki
- Consort: Katarzyna Kotwicz
- Issue: Jan Branicki; Stanisław Branicki; Kasper Branicki; Anna Branicka; Elżbieta Branicka

Grzegorz Branicki z Ruszczy (c. 1534–1595) was a Polish nobleman. He was Łowczy of Kraków from 1563, burgrave of Kraków from 1590, and starost of Niepołomice.

He wrote a commentary in Jan Achacy Kmita's 1588 book Treny na śmierć Katarzyny Branickiej ("Laments on Death by Katarzyna Branicka").
