= Księżomierz-Osada =

- Village
- Location within Poland
- Coordinates: 50°55′N 22°00′E
- Country: Poland
- Voivodeship: Lublin
- County: Kraśnik
- Gmina: Gościeradów

Księżomierz-Osada [kɕɛ̃ˈʐɔmjɛʂ ɔˈsada] is a village in the administrative district of Gmina Gościeradów, within Kraśnik County, Lublin Voivodeship, in eastern Poland.
