= Księżomierz-Kolonia =

- Village
- Location within Poland
- Coordinates: 50°55′N 21°58′E
- Country: Poland
- Voivodeship: Lublin
- County: Kraśnik
- Gmina: Gościeradów
- Population: 1,400

Księżomierz-Kolonia [kɕɛ̃ˈʐɔmjɛʂ kɔˈlɔɲa] is a village in the administrative district of Gmina Gościeradów, within Kraśnik County, Lublin Voivodeship, in eastern Poland.
