= Mniszek, Lublin Voivodeship =

Mniszek
- Village
- Location within Poland
- Coordinates: 50°50′N 21°57′E
- Country: Poland
- Voivodeship: Lublin
- County: Kraśnik
- Gmina: Gościeradów

Mniszek [ˈmniʂɛk] is a village in the administrative district of Gmina Gościeradów, within Kraśnik County, Lublin Voivodeship, in eastern Poland.
