= Gościeradów-Kolonia =

- Village
- Location within Poland
- Coordinates: 50°50′53″N 22°00′49″E
- Country: Poland
- Voivodeship: Lublin
- County: Kraśnik
- Gmina: Gościeradów

Gościeradów-Kolonia (Polish pronunciation: [ɡɔɕt͡ɕɛˈraduf kɔˈlɔɲa]) is a village in the administrative district of Gmina Gościeradów, within Kraśnik County, Lublin Voivodeship, in eastern Poland.
