= Antoni Oleszczyński =

Polish graphic artist (1794–1879)

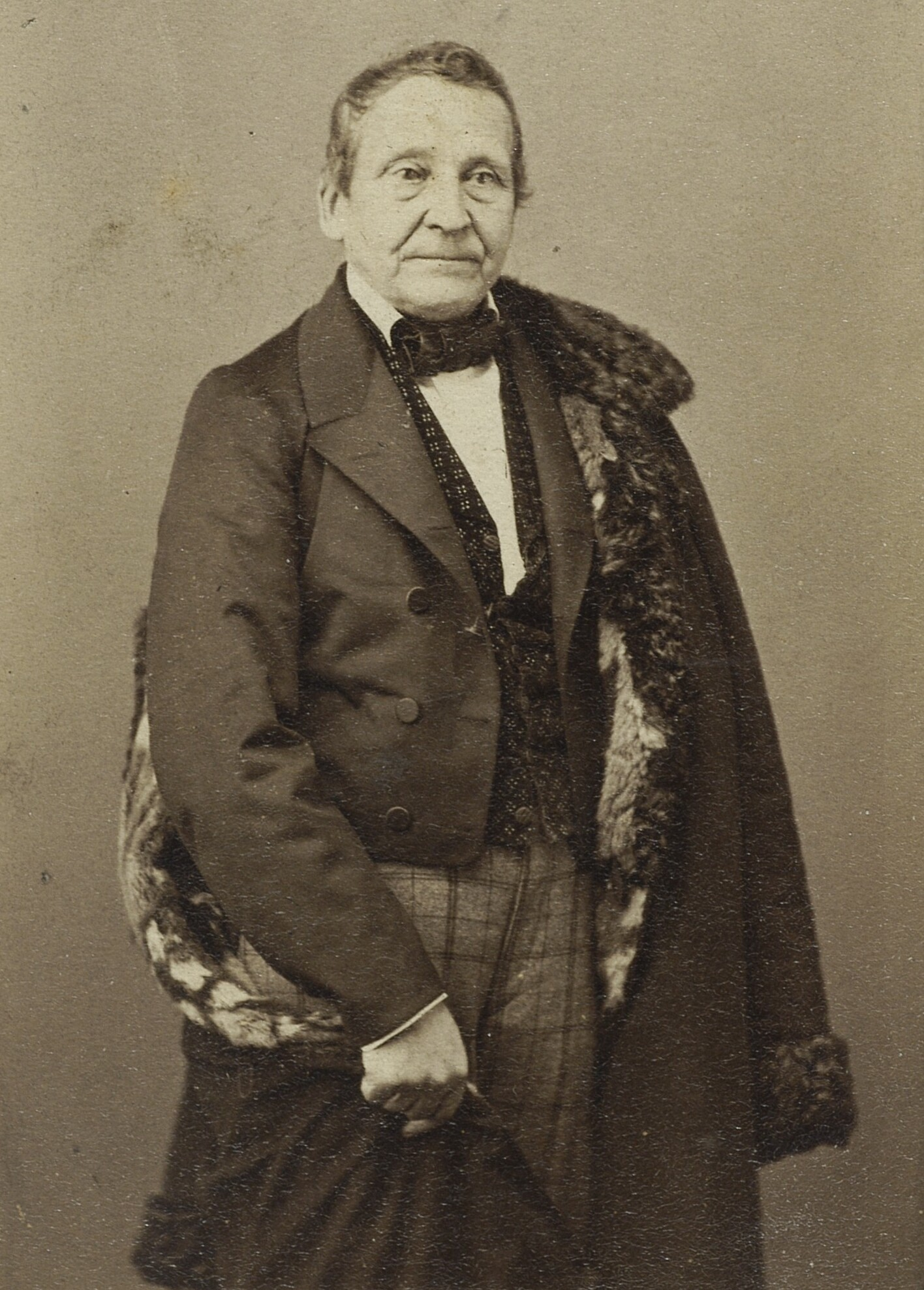
Antoni Oleszczyński, 1863

Antoni Oleszczyński (16 January 1794, Krasnystaw – 28 February 1879, Paris) was a Polish graphic artist and copperplate engraver.

== Biography ==
His father was a magistrate. While working for the Ministry of Education in Warsaw, he presented samples of his calligraphy to Ministry headquarters and was sent at government expense, from 1817 to 1824, to study at the Imperial Academy of Arts in Saint Petersburg with Nikolai Utkin, where he received several silver medals.

Upon graduating, he was awarded a gold medal for his engraving of Alexander Kokorinov, after a portrait by Dmitry Levitzky. He then went to Paris, again at government expense, where he worked in the studios of the painter Jean-Baptiste Regnault and the engraver Théodore Richomme. After that, he spent four years in Florence.

In 1832, he received an offer of employment at the Academy, but he chose to become part of the Great Emigration and settled in Paris, where he remained until his death. He contributed engravings to several "clandestine" Polish language publications including Babin na obcej ziemi (Babin in a Strange Land, by the "Babin Republic") and issued two albums with text; Rozmaitości polskie (Polish Miscellany, 1833) and Wspomnienia o polakach, co słynęli w obcych i odległych krajach (Memories of the Poles who became famous in foreign countries, 1843). He also illustrated the Polish history of Lucjan Siemieński and several works by Leonard Chodźko.

His younger brothers both became artists. Seweryn Oleszczyński was an engraver for the Bank of Poland and Władysław was a noted sculptor.

== Selected portraits ==
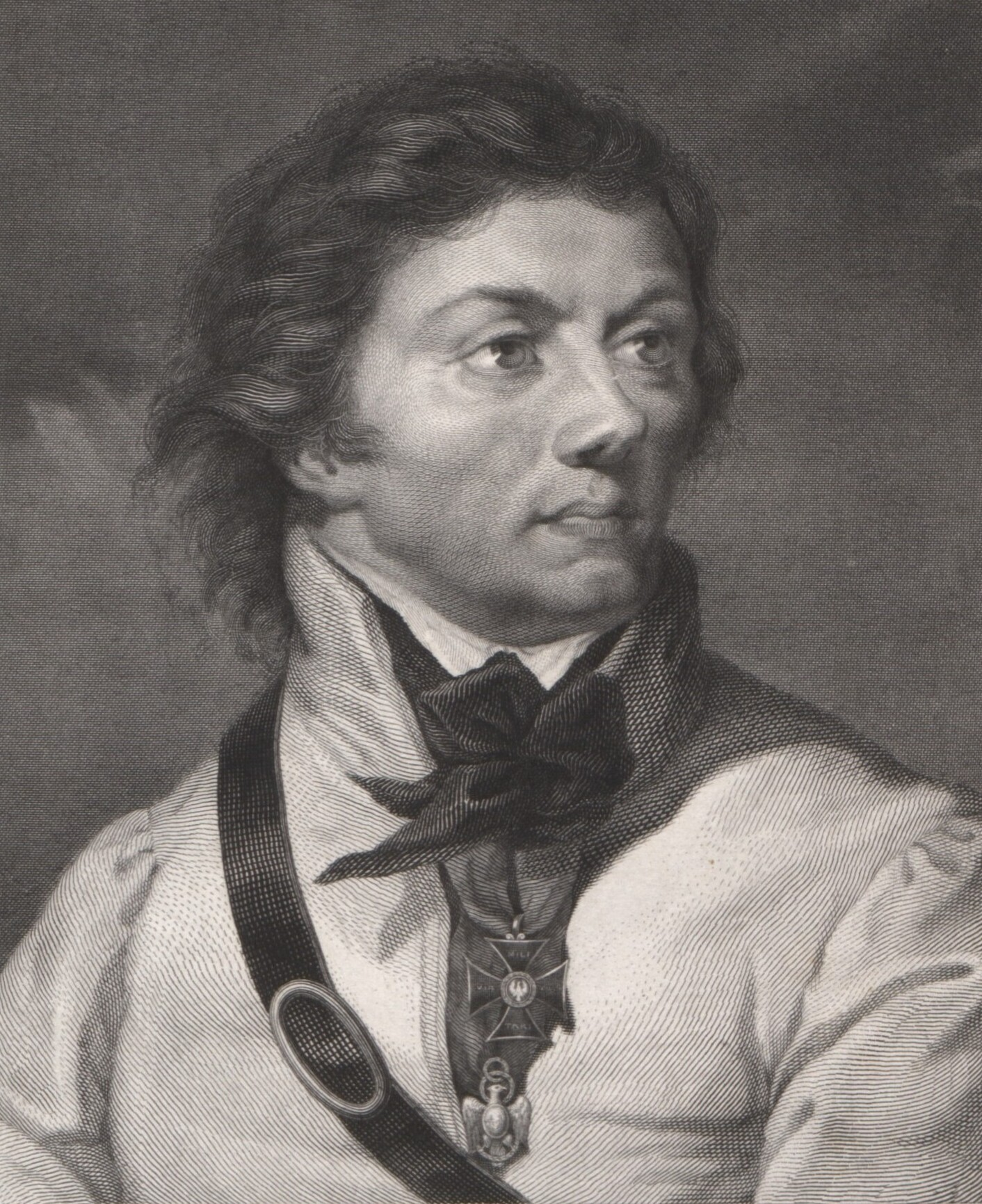
Tadeusz Kościuszko

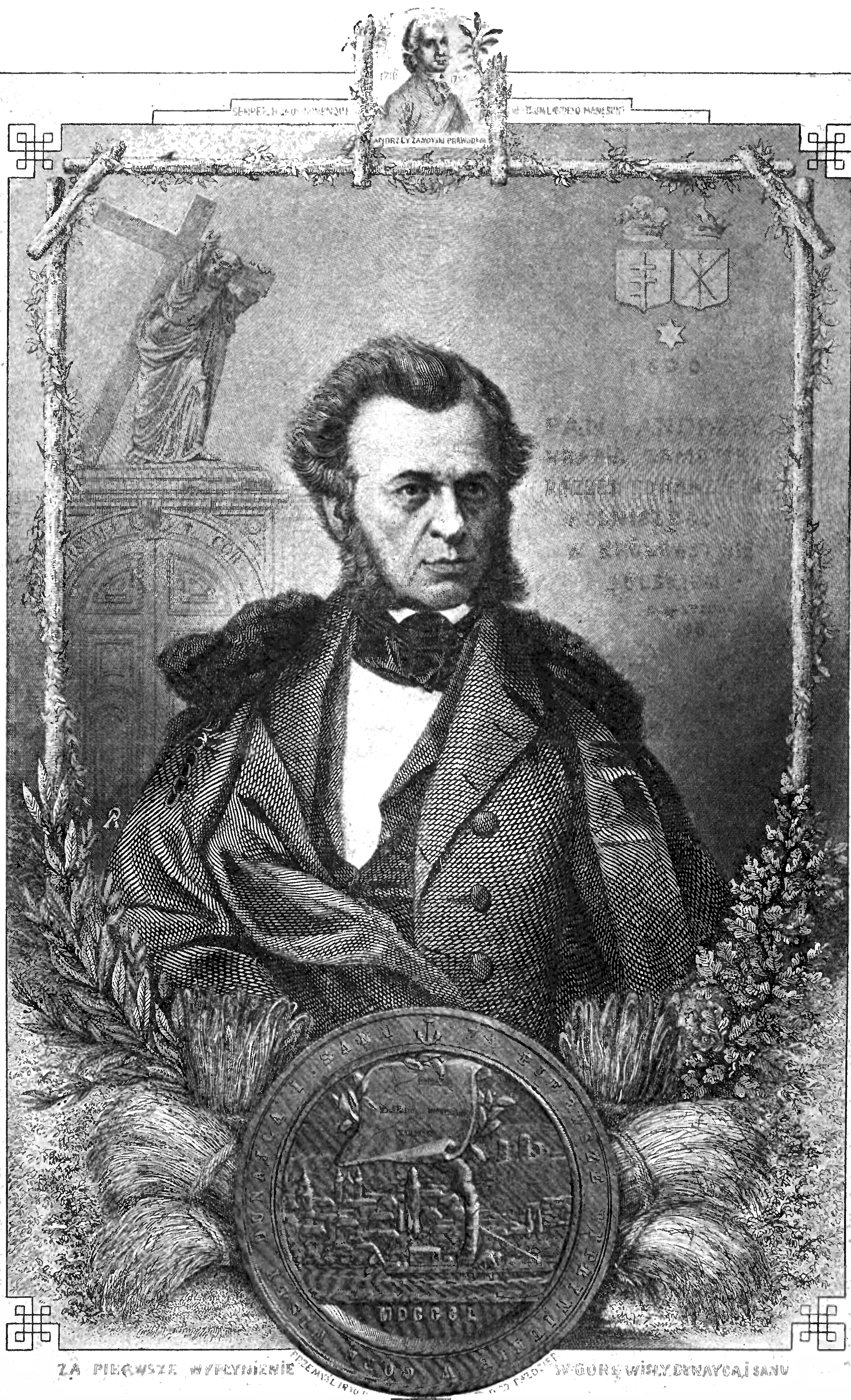
Andrzej Artur Zamoyski

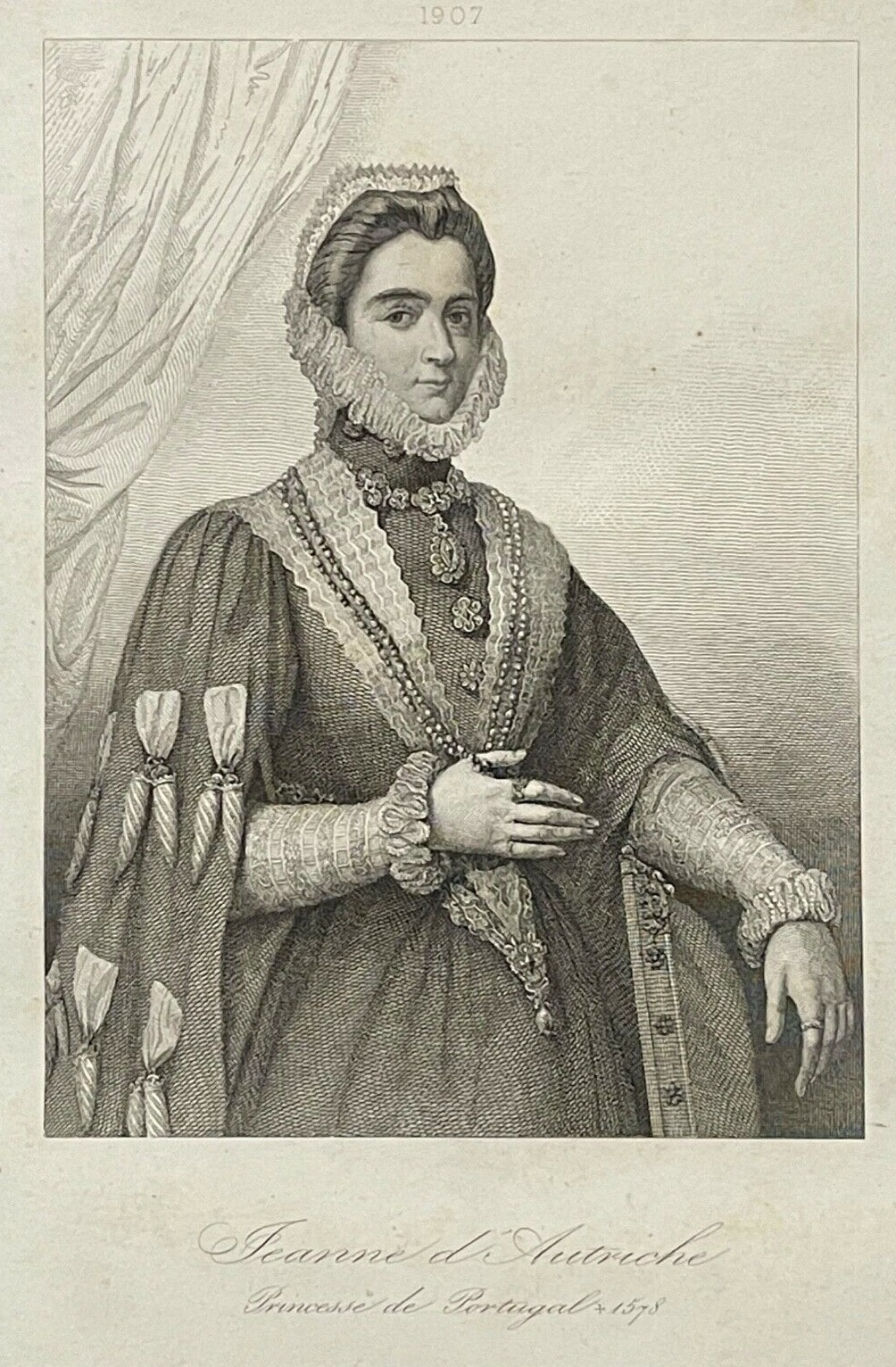
Joanna of Austria, Princess of Portugal

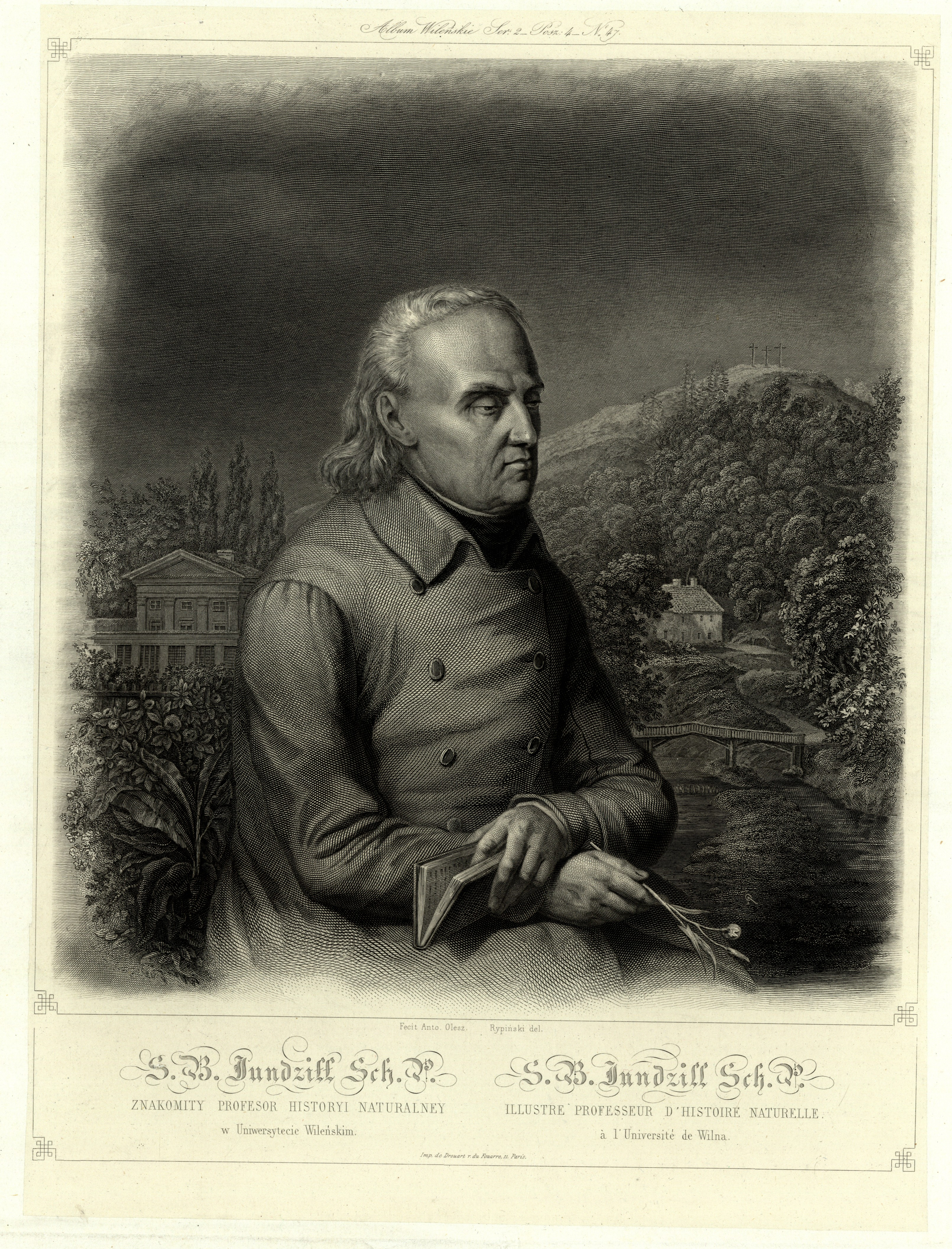
Stanisław Bonifacy Jundziłł

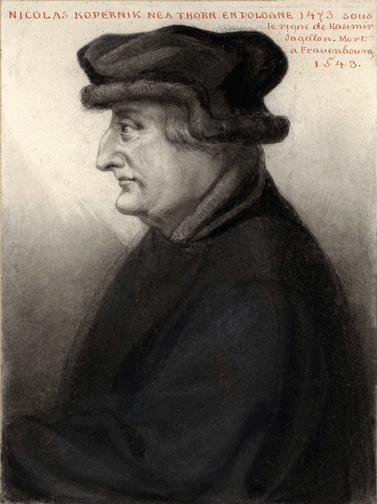
Nicolaus Copernicus
