= Gryf coat of arms =

Polish coat of arms

Gryf
- Battle cry: Po trzy na gałąź, Świeboda
- Alternative names: Swoboda, Świeboda, Jaxa
- Earliest mention: 1369
- Cities: Choroszcz, Dębica, Miechów
- Divisions: Mielec County, Gmina Miechów
- Families: 481 names A Aksamitowski, Aksentowicz, Androniewski, Andronowski, Andrzejkiewicz, Andrzejkowicz, Ankowski, Axamitowski, Axentowicz. B Babowski, Bakowski, Bałd, Banowski, Bańkowski, Batowicz, Batowt, Bawołowski, Bąkowski, Bąkowski-Jaksa, Behme, Belicki, Beliski, Bełhacki, Bełzki, Będa, Bielicki, Bielski, Bieniaszewski, Bieniażewski, Bilański, Birowo, Bitner, Bitowt, Bitowtowicz, Bober, Bobowski, Bobriński, Bobrowicz, Bobryński, Bogatko, Bogusław, Bokowski, Bońkowski, Borkowicz, Borowski, Borzesławski, Borzysławski, Botowd, Botowicz, Botowt, Bóbr, Brajczewski, Brajszewski, Branicki, Brański, Braun, Broniec, Broniecki, Bryliński, Brzezieński, Brzeziński, Brzeźnicki, Brzeżnicki, Bubowski, Burnejko, Burzyński, Butowicz, Butowt, Butowtowicz, Buttowd, Buttowt, Bykowski. C Ceder, Cedro, Cedrowicz, Cedrowski, Chamiec, Chamski, Charzewski, Chicki, Chłądowski, Chłędowski, Chomski, Chotowski, Chrapkowicz, Chroniowski, Chronowski, Chycki, Chyćko, Ciepielewski, Ciepielowski, Cikowski, Cygański, Cykowski, Czader, Czajański, Czajęcki, Czaykowski, Czepielewski, Czepielowski, Czepilewski, Czykowski. D Dembicki, Dębicki, Dobek, Doberski, Dobkiewicz, Dobko, Domaracki, Domaradzki, Dowiat, Dowiatt, Dziwisz. F Fąferek G Gąbski, Gedajmin, Gesztowt, Getka, Getkin, Getko, Gębski, Gędka, Giedczycki, Giedczyński, Giedecki, Giedmin, Giedrzycki, Giedymin, Giedziński, Gienk, Gienko, Gierntowt, Giesztowt, Gładysz, Gładyszewski, Głuchowski, Gołąbek, Gosicki, Goszycki, Grefkowicz, Gregorowicz, Grodzicki, Gross, Gruźdź, Gryczka, Gryffin, Gryfin, Grynkiewicz, Grzywaldzki, Grzywladski, Gubin, Gulbinowicz, Gumieniecki, Gunther, Gustkowski, Gwoździowski. H Haczewski, Hausman, Hausmann, Haszlakiewicz Hnatkowski, Hromyk, Hromyka, Hronowski, Hroznowski, Hrydzicz. I Ilsinger, Iżyron. J Jaksiński, Jakszewicz, Janik, Jarken, Jarmołowicz, Jaworski, Jawoysz, Jawszyc, Jaxa, Jencewicz, Jeńcewicz, Jezierski, Jowszyc. K Kański, Karpowicz, Kasztanecki, Kawecki, Kawęcki, Kawiecki, Kąsieński, Keller, Kępski, Kęsowski, Khański, Kicki, Kiertut, Kijanowski, Kijański, Kijeński, Kilski, Kleszczewski, Kleszczyński, Klewszczyński, Klimontowicz, Kober, Kobr, Kobro, Kocmyrzewski, Kołaczkowski, Kołucki, Kołudzki, Komarnicki, Komornicki, Komorowski, Konarski, Korabka, Kosmynowski, Kosmyszewski, Kossowicz, Kośficz, Kośmierzowski, Kośminowski, Kotkowski, Kowalewski, Kowarski, Krobanowski, Kromołowski, Krukowski, Kruszewski, Kruszowski, Kryczewski, Krynicki, Krzeczewicz, Krzeczowicz, Krzeszowicki, Krzeszowski, Krzyszewski, Kuniecki, Kurkowski, Kwiatkiewicz, Kwiatkowicz, Kwiatkowski, Kwieciński. L Lang, Laskowski, Latosiński, Latoszyński, Laudyn, Lawczynowski, Lechowicz, Leńkowski, Leśniewski, Leśniowolski, Leśniowski, Leśnowolski, Lewczenko, Ligęza, Lipowski, Lobowski, Lubczewski, Luboński, Lutecki, Luzeński. Ł Łabanowski-Dowiat, Ładoszyński, Łatoszyński, Łobowski, Łobzowski, Łotwiszyński, Łowczewski, Łowczowski, Łowczycki, Łowczynowski, Łupiński. M Macewicz, Makowski, Makulski, Makułowicz, Maleszewski, Maleszowski, Maliszenko, Maliszewski, Maliszowski, Małachowski, Maniukowski, Marcinkowski, Masło, Mąkolski, Micewicz, Micherowski, Michora, Michorowski, Michowski, Mielecki, Mielęcki, Mielędzki, Mikołajewski, Mikołajowski, Mikoszek, Mikoszko, Milecki, Milęcki, Minowski, Mirzewski, Mirzowski, Molenda, Molendowski, Molendziński, Mykoszek, Myrzowski, Myszka. N Nakwaski, Nasiechowski, Nasięchowski, Nast, Nasto, Neczwojewicz, Neczwojowicz, Neledyński, Nieklewicz, Niklewicz, Nosiłowski, Noskowski, Nowoszewicz. O Odorski, Okołowski, Osowiecki, Ossowiecki, Ossowski, Ostrowski, Otffinowski, Otfinowski, Otwinowski. P Pacierkowski, Paluchowski, Panterewicz, Panterowicz, Papieski, Papiewski, Papiński, Papuski, Parys, Pełka, Pepliński, Pietraszko, Piskorzewski, Pobiedziński, Podegrodzki, Podgrodzki, Podogrodzki, Poleski, Polucki, Połucki, Potucki, Poznański, Prochański, Procheński, Pruchański, Prucheński, Pruczeński, Przerembski, Przerębski. R Raczkiewicz, Raczkowicz, Radliński, Rakowski, Rankowicz, Ronikier, Ronow, Rosiejowski, Rosławiec, Rosłowicz, Rosłowiec, Rotarius, Rotariusz, Rotarski, Rozen, Rożen, Rożenkowski, Rożeński, Rożno, Rożnowski, Różycki-Chamski, Rudlicki, Ruszczycki, Ruszkowski. S Sczepanowski, Selimowicz, Sierachowski, Sierakowski, Sirakowski, Skarbek, Skrzyszewski, Skrzyszowski, Sławoszewski, Słocki, Sokołowski, Solecki, Soroko, Stanisławski, Stojowski, Stroniowski, Strzeszkowski, Studzieński, Studziński, Sulisław, Sułocki, Swoszowski, Syrochowski, Szczepanowski, Szczodry, Szczukocki, Szczukowski, Szczynecki, Szlydyen, Szołdrski, Szołomski, Sztukowski, Szulc. Ś Światopełk, Światopełkowicz, Światopołk, Świeboda, Święszek. T Taonowicz, Tągoborski, Tęgoborski, Toporowski, Treska, Tresko, Treszka, Trojacki, Trojecki, Trzeciak, Trzeciecki, Trzeciewski, Tuchaczewski, Turski. U Ujejski, Ulkowski. W Warchałowski, Wdowiszewski, Weszmunt, Weszmuntowicz, Wierzbicki, Wierzbięta, Wiktorowski, Wilkowski, Winiarski, Wiszek, Wiszko, Wiśniewski, Wiśniowski, Wodnicki, Wolski, Wosztort, Wosztowt, Wyszek, Wyszko. Z Zadrożny, Zagórski, Zajezierski, Zakomorny, Zakrzewski, Zakrzowski, Zamiechowski, Zamierowski, Zanietowski, Zaporowski, Zaporski, Zebrzydowski, Zgłobicki, Ziema-Grodzicki, Ziemia, Zienko, Zimnowodzki, Znamierowski, Znamirowski, Zołotar. Ż Żakowski, Żaporski, Żarliński, Żeromski, Żeromski-Jaxa, Żeroński, Żukowski, Żyzmiński.

Gryf (Polish for "Griffin"), also known as Jaxa, is a Polish coat of arms that was used by many noble families in medieval Poland and later under the Polish–Lithuanian Commonwealth, branches of the original medieval Gryfita-Świebodzic family as well as families connected with the Clan by adoption at ennoblement or even by error.

== History ==
=== Legend ===
Leszek III, legendary Prince of Poland, 805?, had 14 sons, of whom the oldest was Popiel I his successor to the throne. Leszek assured special parts of the realm to the remaining sons within his lifetime, obligating them by oath not to make the sovereignty of Popiel contentious. This ensured the safety and liberty of the country with a united army.

- The other sons:
- Barnim and Bogdal kept the principality of Pomerania.
- Kazimierz and Władysław, the principality of Kashubia
- Vratislav, the island Rügen, with Przybysław.
- Cieszymierz and Otto, the Lusatia (Łużyce),
- Ziemowit and Zemornyst, the land of Brandenburg (Brenna & Stodorania).
- Jaxa with another brother, the Meissen county (Miśnia), in Lusatia (Łużyce)

All these sons united under one war flag given by Leszek. The Lechites originally had a young lion on its war flag, then around 550, the white eagle appeared as a realm flag. The combination of both animal pictures into one figure has developed. Hence a lion's body and an eagle's head, which appears on and above the Gryf shield.

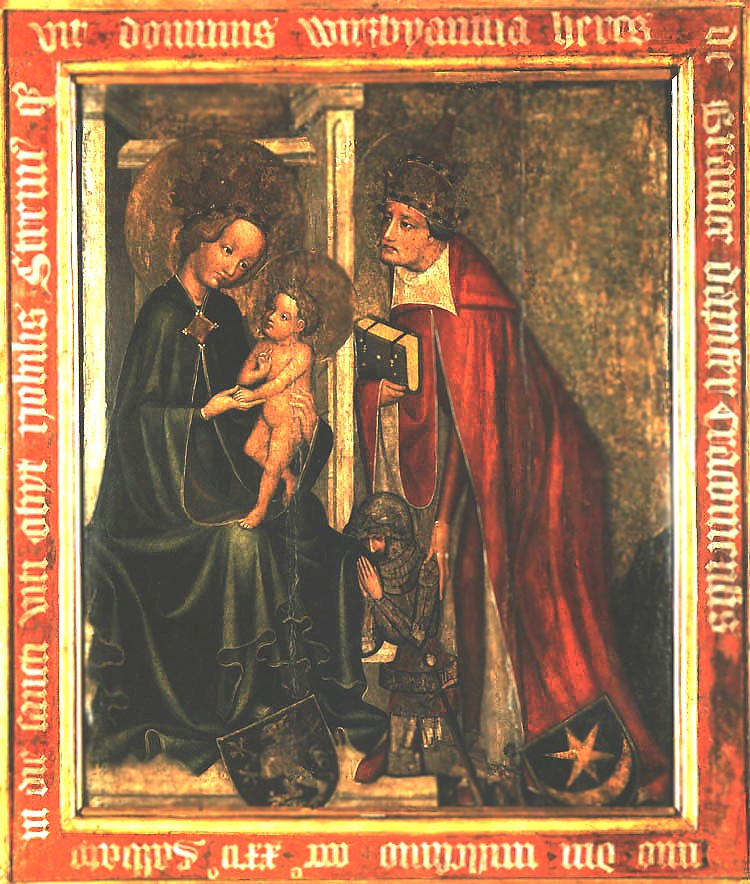
The Gryf coat of arms on the left side next to the Leliwa coat of arms, on the painting Epitafium Wierzbięty z Branic, 1425

== Notable bearers ==
Notable bearers of this coat of arms have included:

- Gryfici (Świebodzice)
  - Jaksa Gryfita
  - Andrzej Gryfita
    - House of Branicki
      - Jan Klemens Branicki
      - Jan Klemens Branicki, Marshall of the Crown Tribunal
      - Stefan Mikołaj Branicki, Voivode of Podlasie
      - Grzegorz Branicki
      - Anna Branicka
    - House of Mielecki
      - Mikołaj Mielecki
      - Zofia Mielecka
- Kazimierz Małachowski
- Józef Leśniewski, general
- Abraham z Jaxów Chamiec, first known owner of Międzyrzec Podlaski
- Bogdan Jaksa-Ronikier, writer and publicist
- Aleksander Krzysztof Chodkiewicz, Bishop of Kieś and Canon of Wilno
- Zygmunt Rożen, knight
- Mateusz Michał Bąkowski, Stolnik of Halicz
- Szymon Konarski, heraldist
- House of Otwinowski
  - Erazm Otwinowski poet and Socinian activist
  - Franciszek Jaxa Otwinowski, member of the Sejm
  - August Otwinowski, Burgrave of Kraków

== Individual grants based on Gryf ==
Counts Dębicki

Counts Konarski

Barons Bobowski

Bałła (odm. Gryf)

Rosen, a variation of Gryf according to Przemysław Pragert

Jadunka, a variation of Gryf according to Przemysław Pragert

Białoskrzydł coat of arms

== Gallery ==
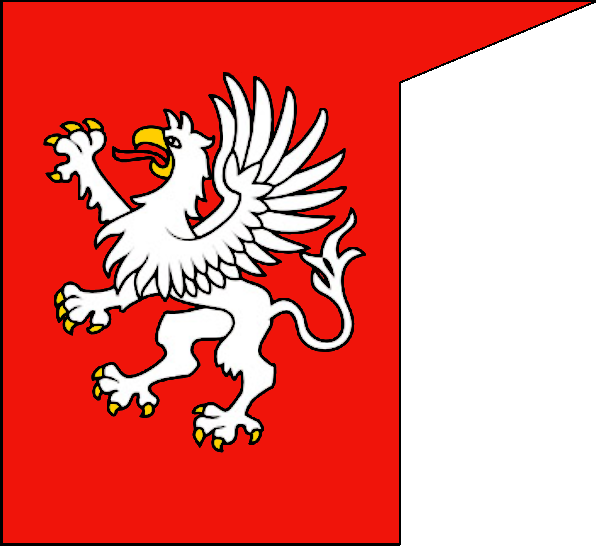
The Gryf brotherhood and knights led by Zygmunt z Bobowej participated at the Battle of Grunwald.

== Related coat of arms ==
- Chodkiewicz Coat of Arms
- Coat of arms of Latvia
- Coat of arms of Ainaži

== See also ==
- Polish heraldry
- Heraldic family
- List of Polish nobility coats of arms
- House of Griffins
- House of Sobiesław

== Bibliography ==
- Tadeusz Gajl: Herbarz polski od średniowiecza do XX wieku : ponad 4500 herbów szlacheckich 37 tysięcy nazwisk 55 tysięcy rodów. L&L, 2007. ISBN 978-83-60597-10-1.
- Jan Długosz: Jana Długosza kanonika krakowskiego Dziejów polskich ksiąg dwanaście, ks. IX. Kraków: 1867-1870, s. 264.
