= Suchodoły, Kraśnik County =

Suchodoły
- Village
- Location within Poland
- Coordinates: 50°54′25″N 22°4′40″E
- Country: Poland
- Voivodeship: Lublin
- County: Kraśnik
- Gmina: Gościeradów

Suchodoły [suxɔˈdɔwɨ] is a village in the administrative district of Gmina Gościeradów, within Kraśnik County, Lublin Voivodeship, in eastern Poland.
