= Bazyli Skalski =

Bazyli Skalski was a printer in Cracow in the late sixteenth and early seventeenth centuries.

Skalski began his printing career in the Drukarnia Łazarzowa, which had been founded in Cracow in the mid-sixteenth century by Łazarz Andrysowicz. Skalski opened his own printing office in 1605 or 1606. His most famous print was Simon Syrenius's Zielnik in 1613.

== Works published ==
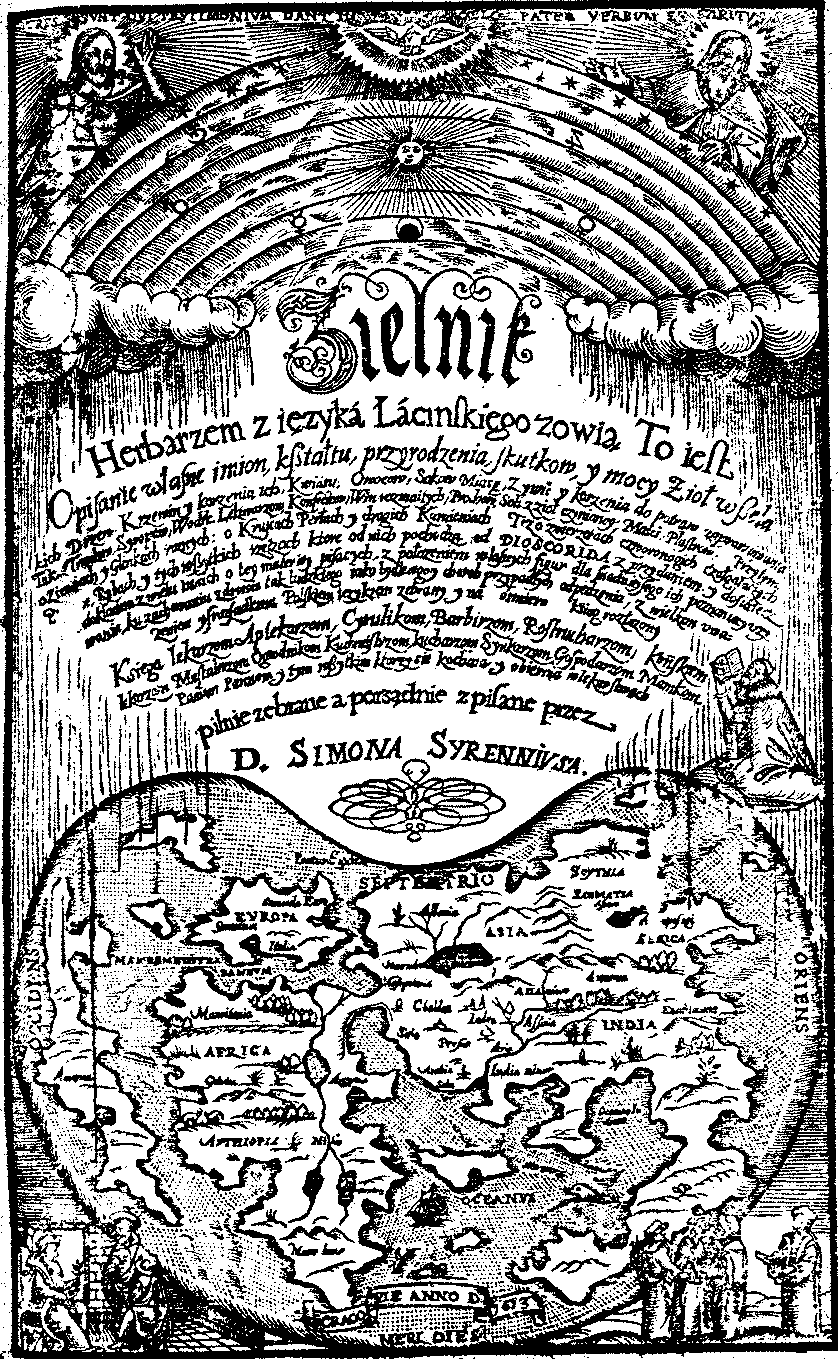
Title page of Syrenius' Zielnik (Cracow, 1613)

- Seb. Petrycy Horatius w Lirykach. 1609.
- Syrenius, Simon. Zielnik. 1613.
- Przewodowskiego (Hier. z Brzan) Judasz z potomstwem swoim albo Kronika rodzaiu y roboty Ministrow heretyckich. 1611.
- Xeniolum inclyta Civitati Leopoliensi... 1619.
- Panegyricus ill. & magnif. Domino dn. Stanisłao Lubomirski... 1619.
