= Liśnik Duży =

- Village
- Location within Poland
- Coordinates: 50°53′N 22°5′E
- Country: Poland
- Voivodeship: Lublin
- County: Kraśnik
- Gmina: Gościeradów
- Time zone: UTC+1 (CET)
  - Summer (DST): UTC+2 (CEST)

Liśnik Duży [ˈliɕnik ˈduʐɨ] is a village in the administrative district of Gmina Gościeradów, within Kraśnik County, Lublin Voivodeship, in eastern Poland.

== History ==
Eleven Polish citizens were murdered by Nazi Germany in the village during World War II.
