= Szczecyn =

- Village
- Location within Poland
- Coordinates: 50°49′N 21°59′E
- Country: Poland
- Voivodeship: Lublin
- County: Kraśnik
- Gmina: Gościeradów

Szczecyn [ˈʂt͡ʂɛt͡sɨn] is a village in the administrative district of Gmina Gościeradów, within Kraśnik County, Lublin Voivodeship, in eastern Poland.
