= Babin Republic =

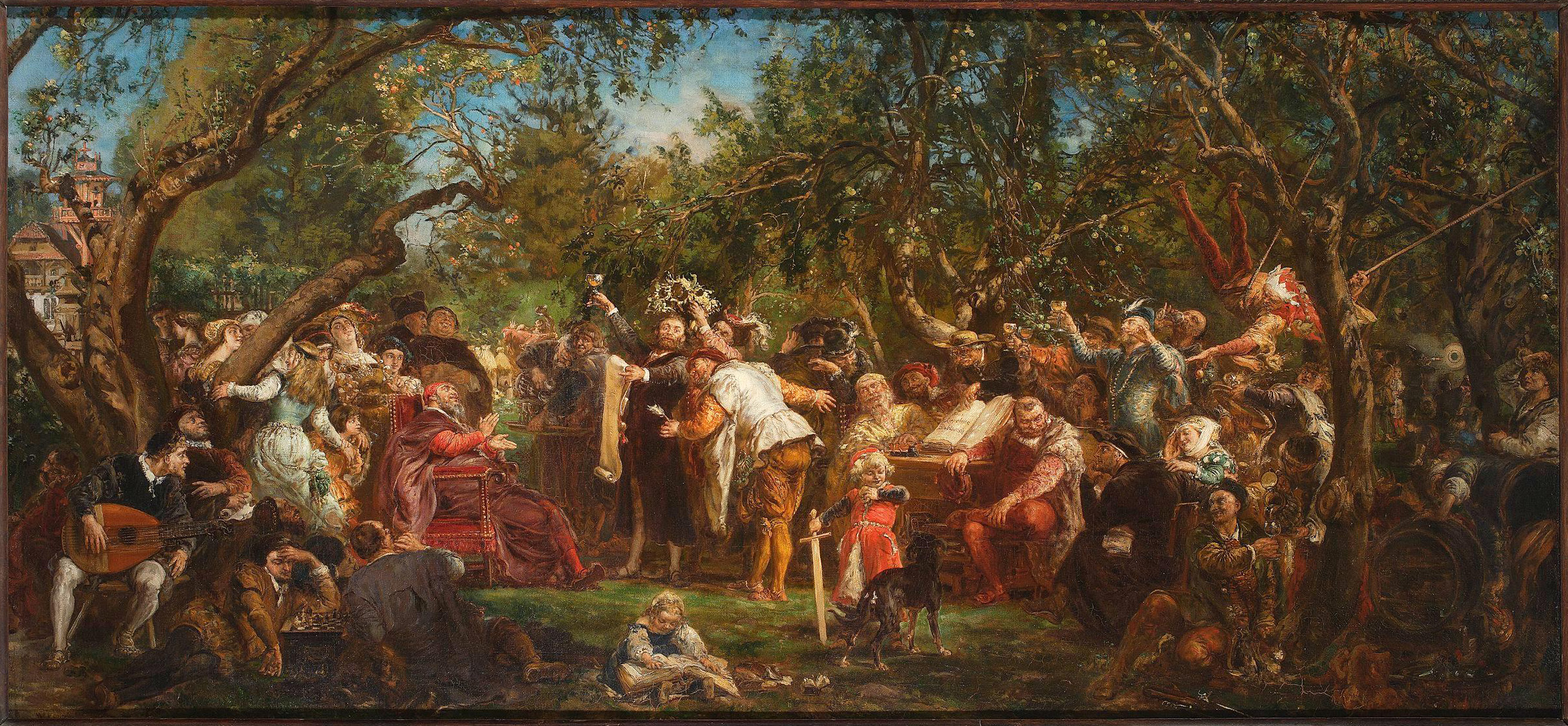
The Babin Republic by Jan Matejko

The Babin Republic (Polish: Rzeczpospolita Babińska) was a satirical, carnival and literary society founded in 1568 by Stanisław Pszonka and Piotr Kaszowski in Babin, Lublin Voivodeship, Poland. Its Latin motto was: Omnis Homo Mendax ("Every man is a liar").

The Babin Republic was set up as a parody of a republican state. To this end, the Republic bestowed sarcastic "offices" and "titles" to those who embarrassed themselves in public due to some fault or folly, and to those who told ridiculously untrue stories. People with poor speaking skills were declared "Speakers of the Republic", gossipmongers were made members of the "Secret Council", litigious people were declared "Justices of the Peace", people who exaggerated their hunting exploits were made "Masters of the Hunt", etc. All nominations were dutifully entered into the Memorial Register of Babin Officials. There was a total of 411 accounts in the register. Some of the fanciful stories show influences of Rabelais and Boccaccio. The society was an institution in the cultural life in post-Renaissance Poland and survived until 1677. The Babin Republic spawned a few humorous expressions in Polish of the time, such as rycerz z Babina ("a Babin knight"), meaning "coward", or wiesci z Babina ("news from Babin"), meaning "false rumors".

== See also ==
- E Clampus Vitus

== Sources ==
- (in German) Babinische Republik, Meyers Konversations-Lexikon. 4th Ed., Vol 2, Bibliographisches Institut, Leipzig, 1885–1892, p. 203.
- (in Polish) Bronisław Nadolski, Cyprian Mielczarski, Dobrosława Platt. Towarzystwa literackie i naukowe. In: Teresa Michałowska, Barbara Otwinowska, Elżbieta Sarnowska-Temeriusz: Słownik literatury staropolskiej : średniowiecze, renesans, barok. Wrocław: Zakład Narodowy im. Ossolińskich – Wydaw., 2002. ISBN 83-04-04621-0
- (in Polish) K. Bartoszewicz, Rzeczpospolita Babińska Lwów 1902.
- (in Polish) T. Chabros Z tradycji Lubelszczyzny. Babińskie facecje. In: Życie Lubelskie 1956, z. 6, nr 4.
- (in Polish) A. Kossowski Protestantyzm w Lublinie i w Lubelskiem w XVI i XVII wieku Lublin, 1933.
- (in Polish) A. Kuś Rzeczpospolita Babińska. In: Odrodzenie i Reformacja, b. 47, 2003.
- (in Polish) J.A. Wadowski Kościoły lubelskie na podstawie źródeł archiwalnych Kraków 1907, p. 337.
- (in Polish) T. Wojtaszko Rzeczpospolita babińska przez wieki i okupacje Retro, Lublin 1994.
