= Babin, Lublin Voivodeship =

Babin
- Village
- Location within Poland
- Coordinates: 51°11′N 22°17′E
- Country: Poland
- Voivodeship: Lublin
- County: Lublin
- Gmina: Bełżyce

Population
  - Total: 830

Babin [ˈbabʲin] is a village in the administrative district of Gmina Bełżyce, within Lublin County, Lublin Voivodeship, in eastern Poland.

A large skirmish took place near the village during the November Uprising (17 April 1831).
