= Grabówka =

Grabówka may refer to the following places in Poland:

- Grabówka, district of the city of Częstochowa
- Grabówka, district of the city of Tarnów
- Grabówka, Lower Silesian Voivodeship (south-west Poland)
- Grabówka, Kuyavian-Pomeranian Voivodeship (north-central Poland)
- Grabówka, Kraśnik County in Lublin Voivodeship (east Poland)
- Grabówka, Lublin County in Lublin Voivodeship (east Poland)
- Grabówka, Gmina Opole Lubelskie in Opole County, Lublin Voivodeship (east Poland)
- Grabówka, Parczew County in Lublin Voivodeship (east Poland)
- Grabówka, Białystok County in Podlaskie Voivodeship (north-east Poland)
- Grabówka, Zambrów County in Podlaskie Voivodeship (north-east Poland)
- Grabówka, Łódź Voivodeship (central Poland)
- Grabówka, Subcarpathian Voivodeship (south-east Poland)
- Grabówka, Greater Poland Voivodeship (west-central Poland)
- Grabówka, Częstochowa County in Silesian Voivodeship (south Poland)
- Grabówka, Wodzisław County in Silesian Voivodeship (south Poland)
- Grabówka, Kędzierzyn-Koźle County in Opole Voivodeship (south-west Poland)
- Grabówka, Namysłów County in Opole Voivodeship (south-west Poland)
- Grabówka, Warmian-Masurian Voivodeship (north Poland)

== See also ==
- Grabówka Ukazowa
- Grabówek (disambiguation)
