= Esther Nisenthal Krinitz =

Polish Jewish artist (1927–2001)

"On Friday, October 15, 1942, it was the beginning of the end, the somber march of the Rachow Jews to their deaths", Embroidery and fabric collage by Esther Nisenthal Krinitz, 1991

Esther Nisenthal Krinitz (1927 – 30 March 2001) was a Polish Jewish artist.

== Early life ==
Esther Nisenthal (married name Krinitz) was born into a Jewish family in 1927 in a small hamlet, Mniszek in Poland, the second in a family of 5 children and the oldest girl. Her father was Hersh, her mother was Rachel; her older brother, Ruven; and younger sisters were Mania, Chana and Leah, all lived near their grandparents, aunts, uncles and five cousins.

Esther learned to sew with a local dressmaker when she was nine. Four years later, her quiet rural life was turned upside down by the Nazi invasion, and she eventually, year later, sewed her story in a collage.

== Nazi invasion and treatment of Jews ==
In September 1939, Esther watched Nazi German soldiers arrive in her village of Mniszek, strategically located along the east bank of the Vistula River. She was 12 years old.

For the next three years, German troops used Jewish slave labourers from Mniszek and the nearby city of Rachów to build roads and bridges for their Eastern campaign. Her family had survived the German occupation, although their earnings had reduced to almost nil. Her father, a horse trader, could no longer travel. Soldiers had taken the last of her mother's geese just as her eggs were about to hatch.

Once the Nazis began what became known as the "Final Solution", however, the surviving Jews of Rachów and Mniszek, were instructed to leave their homes and report to the train station in Kraśnik, about 20 miles away. Raids had already happened when the family had to hide in the woods; Esther had been hit by a soldier's rifle butt for not putting her hands up high enough.

But that day, her father, Hersh; her mother, Rachel; her older brother, Ruven; and her little sisters, Chana and Leah, and other Jews were set off on the road to Kraśnik. It was the last time Esther saw her family.

== Escape ==
Knowing now that it was not safe for them to be seen, Esther and Mania waited in the forest until the rain ended and their clothes dried. Their story would be that they were from the northern part of Poland, where their family, like others in the region, had lost its farm to a German family. With their digging tools in sacks across their shoulders, they would ask for work in harvesting potatoes.

== Grabówka ==
Until 1944, Esther and Mania cooked, cleaned, cared for animals, helped in the fields, went to church, and lived out the daily lives of two Polish farm girls.

Although the Germans did not have a camp in the village, the Gestapo were stationed nearby and soldiers came and went in the village frequently, commandeering food and other supplies as they needed them.

In May 1944, after both the farmer and his wife had died and Esther was living on the farm by herself, an old soldier in Grabówka, a veteran of the First World War, told his neighbors that he could hear artillery fire in the distance to the east. The Russians were pushing the Germans back across Poland, and the old soldier predicted that the front would be in their village within a few days. Under his direction, the neighbors dug out a bunker and prepared to go below. The battle front arrived as predicted, and the neighbors spent a night in the bunker as the German and Russian artillery engaged on the ground immediately above them.

== Liberation ==
Esther decided to join the Polish Army, then continuing on its way west to Warsaw under Marshal Zhukov's command.

Before she left, Esther set out to see Majdanek for herself. The Polish Army had taken over the camp, and soldiers who had been there for a while served as guides, taking new recruits around to point out the horrors inflicted by the Nazis. With Marshal Zhukov's army, Esther eventually arrived in Germany.

== After the war ==
After the war ended in 1945, Esther returned to Grabówka to get Mania.

She met Max Krinitz there and, in November 1946, married him in a ceremony conducted in the camp. While in Belgium, he contacted a cousin who lived in the United States and she agreed to arrange for sponsorship of his immigration.

In June 1949, Esther, Max and their daughter Bernice emigrated to the United States of America, and she was only 22, when they arrived in New York. She later had another daughter, Helene.

== Return to Poland, illness and death ==
In June 1999, exactly 50 years after she left Europe, Esther returned to Mniszek to see what remained. The landscape of central Poland had not changed: farmers driving horse-drawn wooden wagons, red and yellow fields of poppy and mustard, women carrying baskets overflowing with ripe strawberries. She had embroidered images like that. Both in Mniszek and Grabówka, Esther met again with friends and neighbours from her childhood. "Yes, it was just like that!" they said when she showed them photographs of her sewn art, which she had begun in 1977.

Immediately following her return from Poland, Esther became seriously ill; she died 30 March 2001 at the age of 74.

== Embroidered art ==
Esther Nisenthal Krinitz had begun the first of her series of 36 panels of fabric pictures in 1977, with a depiction of her memories of home and family in Mniszek. Although trained as a dressmaker and highly skilled in needlework, Esther had no training in art and no conception of herself as an artist. Yet her first picture was so well received by her family and friends and was so personally satisfying that Esther went on to do another, also of her childhood home.

The next subjects for her art were two dreams she had had while hiding in Grabówka. Each dream—one in which her grandfather had appeared to her and another in which her mother came for her—had left singular vivid images in Esther's memory, and translating them into pictures was an important accomplishment for her. Once the dream sequence was completed, Esther decided to begin a narrative series that grew increasingly complex. With the addition of text, her art became illustrations of Esther's story of survival.

The contrast in her art in cloth and stitching shows between normal life and horror: flowers and prison camp fencing; the pattern of her dress hiding her from soldiers as a child in the fields; her sisters pretty and ribboned, her grandmother's apron and grandfather's abandoned shoe when he is dragged away and his beard cut; floral cloth for hedges and fields, striped cloth for walls and outhouses; to a small family with suitcases at the Statue of Liberty using her sewing as 'an act of restoration'...'reminiscing'.. 'remembering'..'a slow journey of re-creation.'

== Art and Remembrance ==
It is accompanied with lesson plans to teach about the Holocaust and survivors experiences, and linking it to issues of racism, anti-semitism and xenophobia. The exhibition originals and images has toured cities and galleries / museums across America from 2002 to 2019, and was shown in Canada and Poland.

In 2011, Art and Remembrance completed a 30-minute documentary film, "Through the Eye of the Needle: The Art of Esther Nisenthal Krinitz." The film tells the story of her harrowing experiences surviving the Holocaust in Poland and how she came to create an amazing and beautiful narrative in embroidery and fabric collage through images of Esther’s artwork, and the story in her own voice, as well as interviews with family members and others. It has had over 100,000 viewers on social media.

"Trained as a dressmaker but with no training in art, Esther picked up a needle and thread, intending simply to show her children all that she had gone through. Yet the art she created – both beautiful and shocking – is universal in its appeal, expressing deep love of family and personal courage in the face of terror and loss," said the Smithsonian. Esther Krinitz has literally woven the most shameful chapter in human history into a fabric of art that is at once both beautiful and shocking. It is so important that these works can be shown to the public.' said Honourable Przemyslaw Grudzinski, a former ambassador, the Republic of Poland.

On Holocaust Day 2020, the American Visionary Art Museum released a short clip of the film onto social media.

== Other material ==
- Krinitz, Esther Nisenthal and Bernice Steinhardt, Memories of Survival, New York, Hyperion, 2005. Republished and distributed by Art and Remembrance.
- Fabric of Survival: The Art of Esther Nisenthal Krinitz, Smithsonian Museum
