= Rachów =

Rachów may refer to the following places:

- The Polish name for the town of Rakhiv, Zakarpattia Oblast, Ukraine
- Rachów, Lower Silesian Voivodeship, village in Gmina Malczyce, Środa County in Lower Silesian Voivodeship, Poland
- Annopol-Rachów former village now part of the town of Annopol in Kraśnik county, Lublin Voivodeship, Poland
