= Chomiąża =

Chomiąża may refer to the following places in Poland:

- Chomiąża, Lower Silesian Voivodeship
- Chomiąża, Opole Voivodeship
