= Maltsch =

Maltsch may refer to:

- Maltsch, German name for Malše, a river in Austria and in the Czech Republic, and a right tributary of the Vltava
- Maltsch, German name for Malczyce, village in Środa County, Lower Silesian Voivodeship, in south-western Poland
