= Zastocze =

Zastocze may refer to the following places:

- Zastocze, Lublin Voivodeship (east Poland)
- Zastocze, Masovian Voivodeship (east-central Poland)
- Zastocze, Podlaskie Voivodeship (north-east Poland)
