= Annopol =

- Town
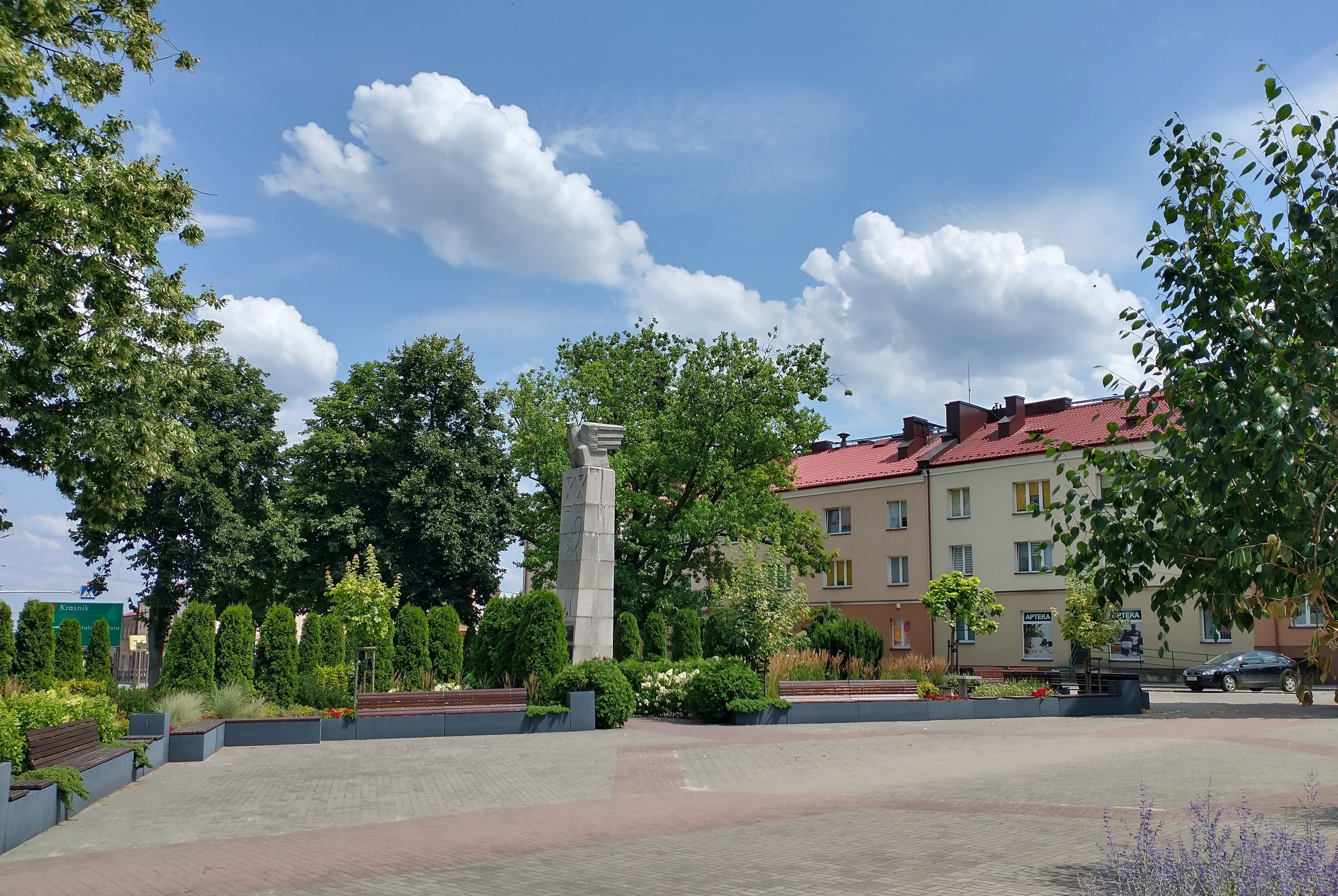
- Market Square with the Monument to Women of Lublin Region murdered by the occupiers during World War II

- Flag Coat of arms

- Location within Poland
- Coordinates: 50°53′07″N 21°51′25″E
- Country: Poland
- Voivodeship: Lublin
- County: Kraśnik
- Gmina: Annopol
- Town rights: 1 January 1996

Government
  - Mayor: Mirosław Gazda

Area
  - Total: 7.73 km^{2} (2.98 sq mi)

Population (30 June 2022)
  - Total: 2,335
  - Density: 302/km^{2} (780/sq mi)
- Time zone: UTC+1 (CET)
  - Summer (DST): UTC+2 (CEST)
- Postal code: 23-235
- Area code: +48 15
- Number plates: LKR
- Website: http://www.annopol.info

Annopol [aˈnːɔpɔl] is a town in south-eastern Poland, located in Kraśnik County in Lublin Voivodeship, in the historic region of Lesser Poland. Annopol has an area of 7.73 square kilometres (2.98 square miles), and as of June 2022 it has 2,335 inhabitants.

== History ==
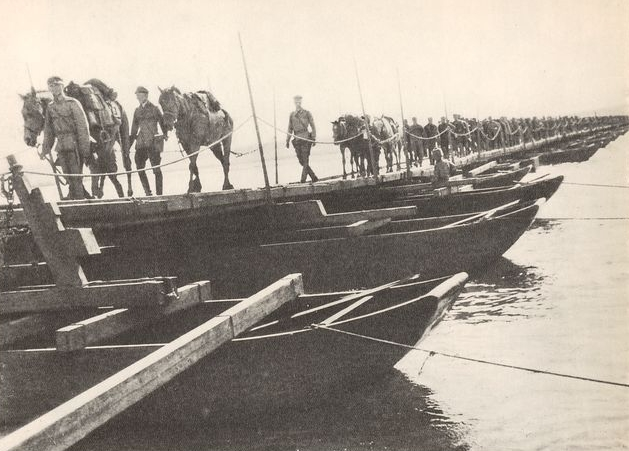
Polish Legions' crossing of the Vistula near Annopol during World War I in 1915

Annopol received town rights in 1761, lost them in 1870 and regained on 1 January 1996. Its coat of arms shows St. Anna, the patron saint of the town (the name means Anna's city, from Greek polis). It owes its picturesque location to the Lesser Polish Gorge of the Vistula.

Jews began to settle in the town in the early 1600s. 73% of the town's population was Jewish by 1921.

Following the German-Soviet invasion of Poland, which started World War II in 1939, Annopol was occupied by Germany until 1944. During the Holocaust, a ghetto was created by the Germans. Jews from nearby villages and smaller towns, as well as from Kalisz and Łódź, were displaced to the Annopol ghetto. Jews from the ghetto were sent to the forced labor camps in nearby Rachów and Janiszów. The ghetto was liquidated on October 15, 1943 and most of the Jews were murdered at the Belzec extermination camp.

The history of Annopol is inextricably linked to that of Annopol-Rachów village close by, often combined as one and the same in written records.

From 1975 to 1998, it was administratively located in the Tarnobrzeg Voivodeship.

== Transport ==
Annopol does not have a rail station, but the town is placed along national road 74, which goes from Piotrków Trybunalski to the Ukrainian border at the village of Zosin. Voivodeship roads 824 and 854 also pass through the town. The Vistula river road bridge at Annopol was built in 1967.

== Gallery ==
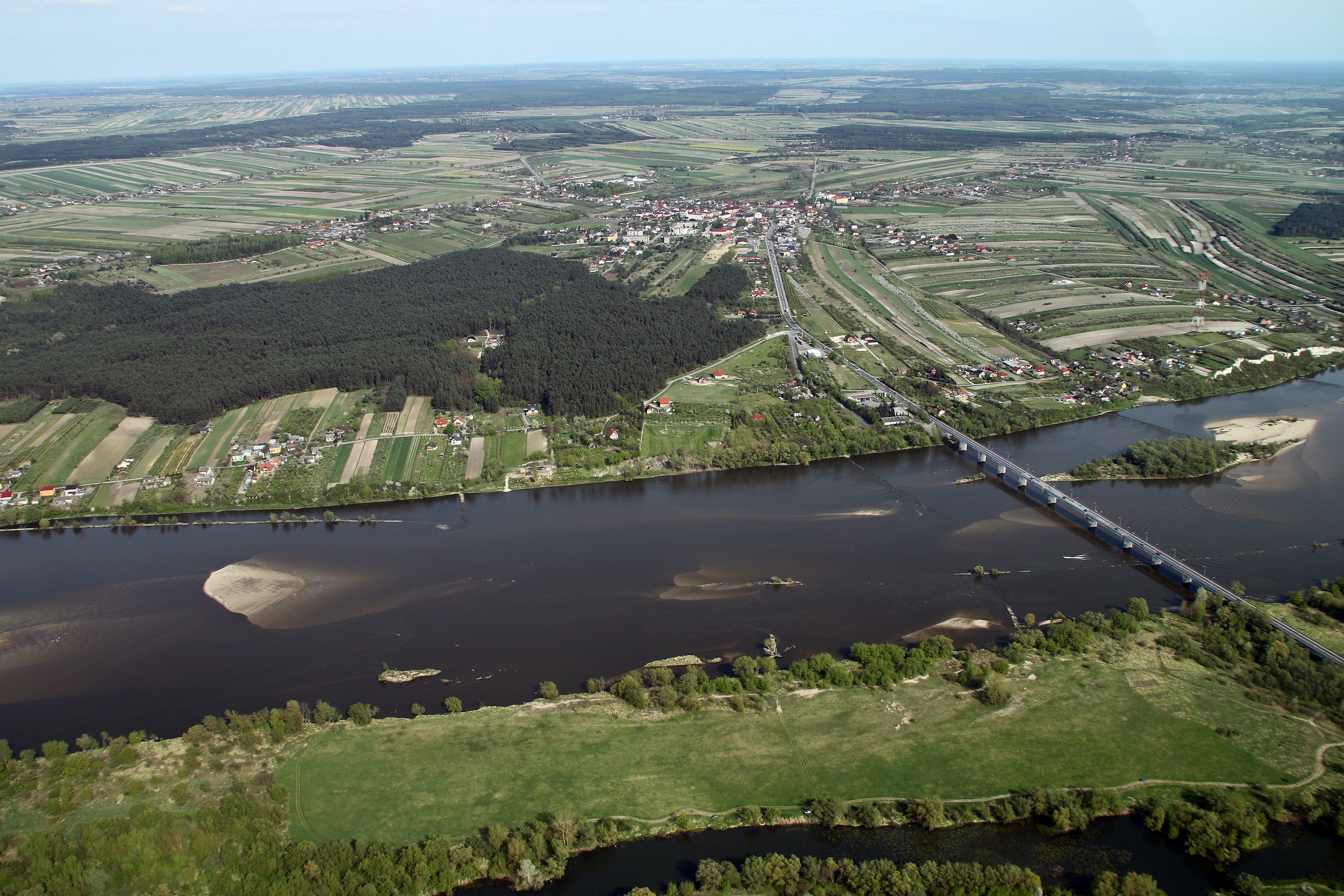
Bridge over Vistula in Annopol

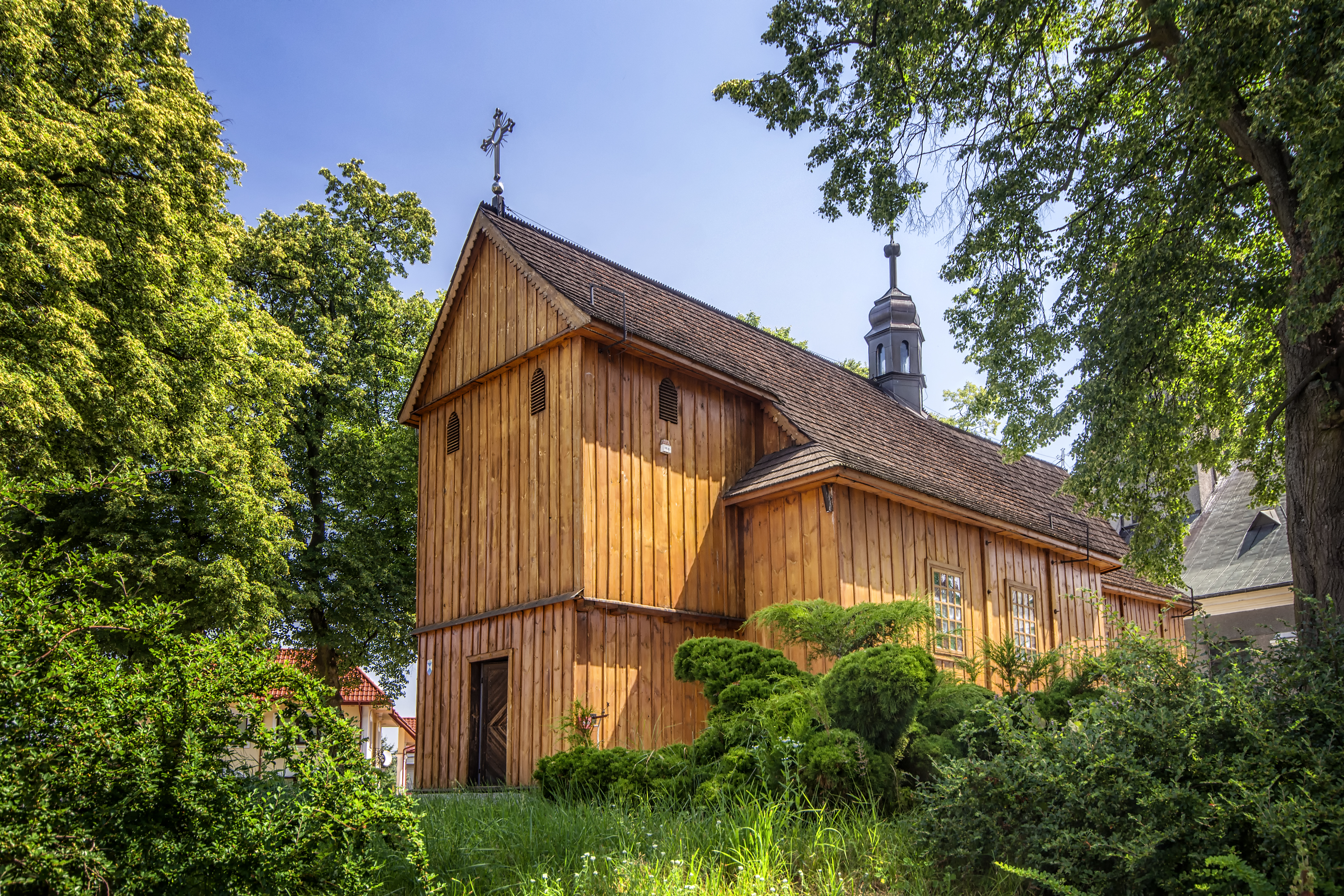
St. Joachim and Anne Church

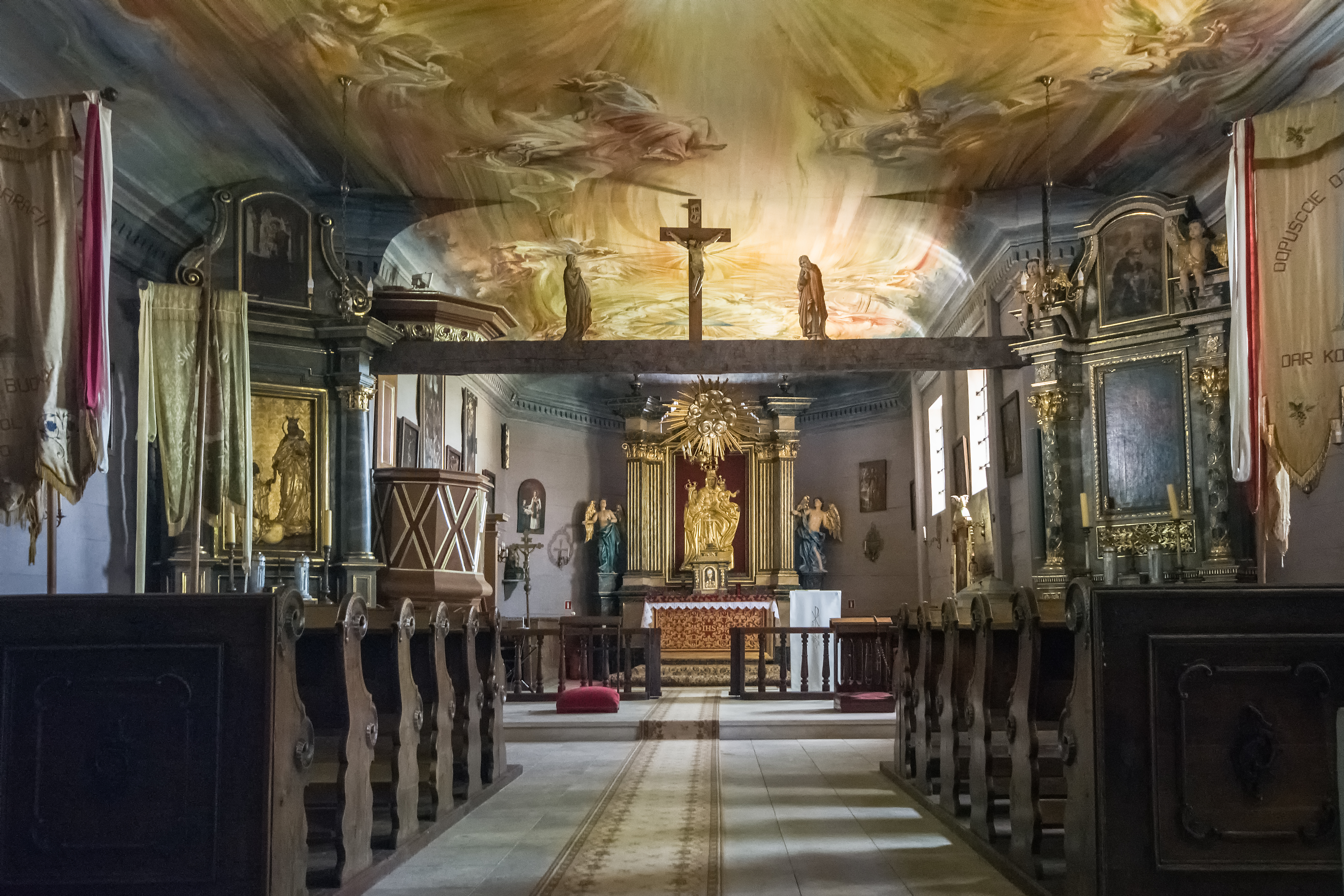
Interior of St. Joachim and Anne Church

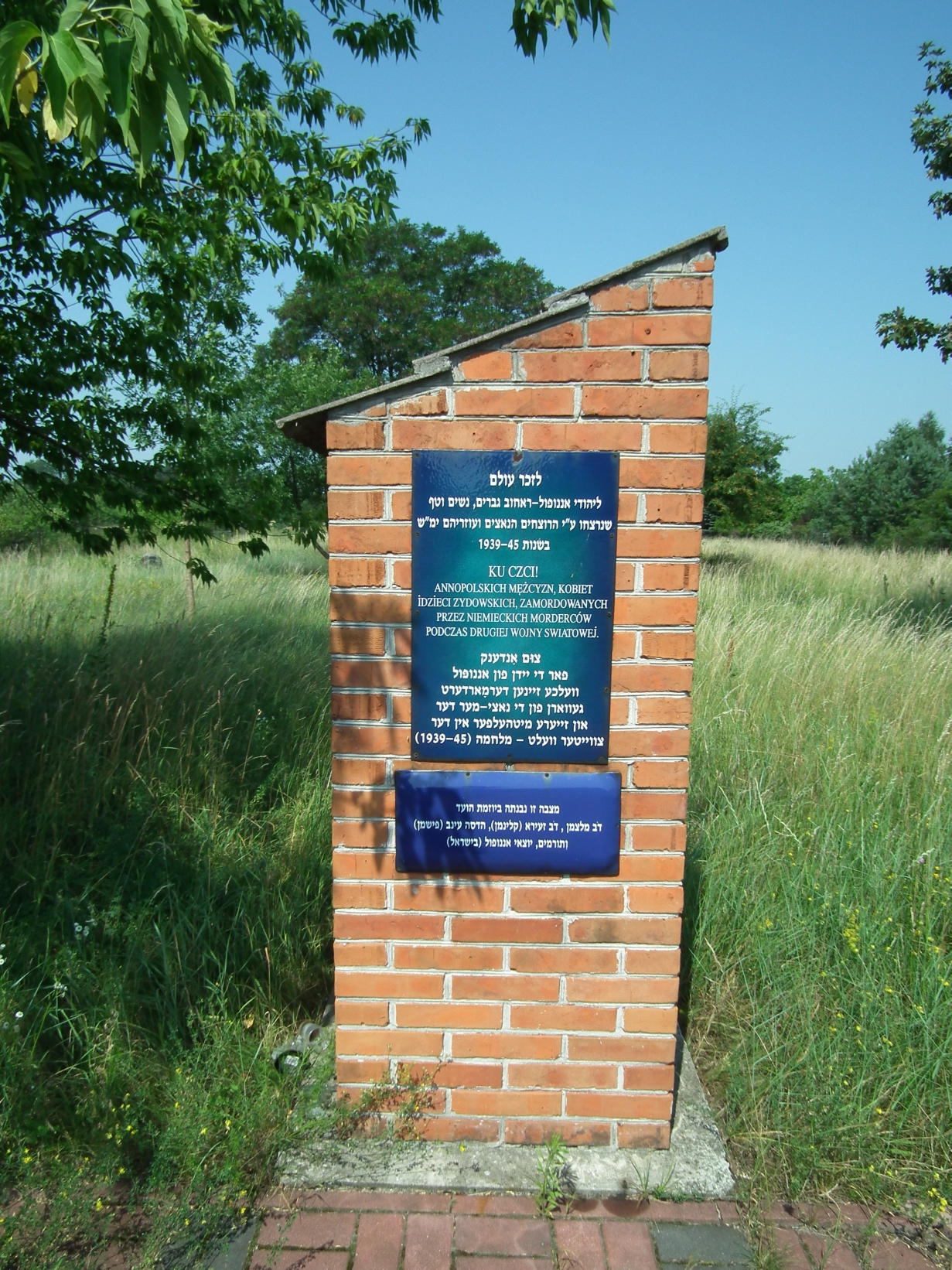
Holocaust memorial at the Jewish cemetery
