= Bronisław Trentowski =

Polish philosopher (1808–1869)

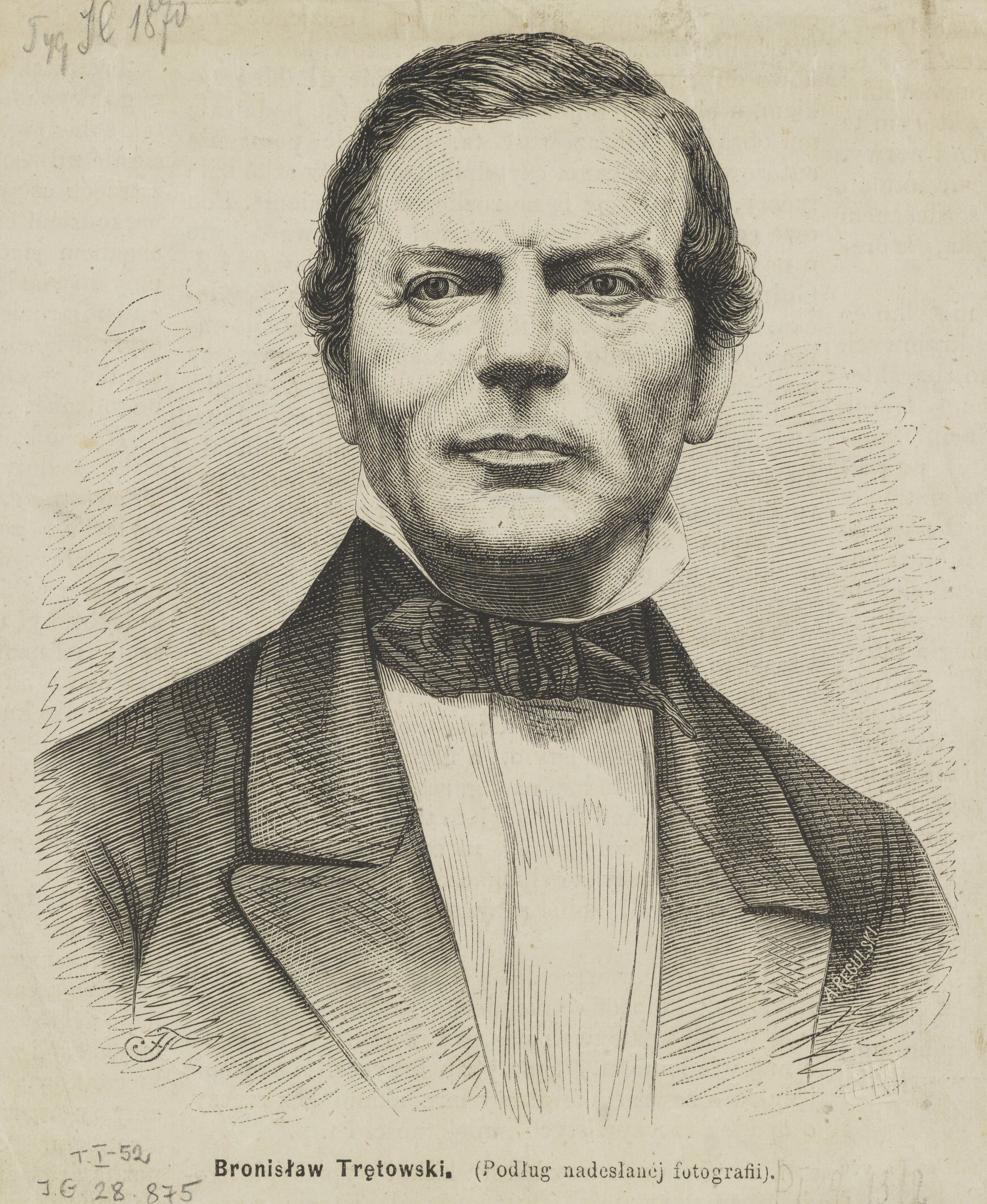
- Portrait of Trentowski by Aleksander Regulski, 1870
- Born: 21 January 1808; Opole, Kingdom of Prussia
- Died: 16 June 1869 (aged 61); Freiburg im Breisgau, Grand Duchy of Baden

Education
- Education: University of Warsaw

Philosophical work
- School: Western philosophy Polish Messianism
- Institutions: University of Freiburg

Bronisław Ferdynand Trentowski (Polish: [trɛnˈtɔfskʲi]; 21 January 1808, Opole – 16 June 1869, Freiburg) was a Polish Messianist philosopher, pedagogist, journalist and Freemason, and the chief representative of the Polish Messianist national philosophy.

== Life ==
Bronisław Trentowski was an alumnus of the Piarist college in Łuków. In his youth, he taught school in Podlasie, then fought as an ulan in the Polish November 1830–31 Uprising. After the uprising's suppression, he emigrated to Germany, eventually settling at Freiburg in Baden. He developed an interest in philosophy, became an assistant professor at Freiburg University and remained there to the end of his life. He attempted to return to Poland, but was expelled from Poznań in 1843 by the Prussian government, and from Kraków in 1848 by the Austrian government.

He published his first work in 1837 in German, but from 1842 he wrote only in Polish, beginning with Chowanna, czyli system pedagogiki narodowej jako umiejętności wychowania, nauki i oświaty, słowem wykształcenia naszej młodzieży (Chowanna, or the System of National Pedagogy as the Science of Education and Instruction, in a Word, of Educating Our Youth).

Trentowski, in his book Stosunek filozofii do cybernetyki, czyli sztuki rządzenia narodem (The Relation of Philosophy to Cybernetics, or the Art of Governing a Nation, 1843), was the first Polish-language author to use the term "cybernetics."

In 1847–48 he wrote a book, Wiara słowiańska, czyli etyka piastująca wszechświat (The Slavic Faith, or the Ethics that Governs the Universe), demonstrating that the Slavic gods were a form of the same god that was worshipped by Christians.

From 1840 Trentowski wrote for Tygodnik Literacki (The Literary Weekly), Rok (The Year), Biblioteka Warszawska (The Warsaw Library) and Orędownik Naukowy (The Spokesman of Science).

Trentowski preached the concept of a "national philosophy," i.e., a philosophy sprung from the peculiar characteristics of the Polish people that would serve that people in the accomplishment of its historic mission. Based on his philosophy, he created a pedagogical system that was intended to revive the Polish nation through education and an upbringing in a spirit of patriotism (a program of "national pedagogy"). In psychology, he introduced the concept of an individual, singular "self" (jaźń); and he treated a society as a collection of "selves." In political philosophy, he postulated the reconciliation of reforms with national tradition.

Trentowski had much in common with fellow Polish Messianist Józef Maria Hoene-Wroński. He had the same speculative mentality; the same maximalist aspirations in philosophy and conviction that "God had destined [him] for the complete reform of learning, and through it the rebirth of society."

The chief object of his philosophy was universality, an emergence from one-sided solutions. One-sided to him were realism and idealism, objective and subjective points of view, experience and mind, empirical and metaphysical knowledge. He sought to go beyond these antitheses to a synthesis. He judged Messianism severely and rejected any connection with German philosophy; in fact, however, he was taken with German Hegelianism, and in his later writings also with the Messianist national ideology, and the union of these two elements constituted the fabric of his philosophy.

== Works ==
- Chowanna, czyli system pedagogiki narodowej (Chowanna, or the System of National Pedagogy, vols. 1–2, 1842).
- Stosunek filozofii do cybernetyki, czyli sztuka rządzenia narodem (The Relation of Philosophy to Cybernetics, or the Art of Governing a Nation, 1843).
- Myślini, czyli całokształt logiki narodowej (Myślini, or the Complete National Logic, vols. 1–2, 1844).
- Wizerunki duszy narodowej z końca ostatniego stulecia (Images of the National Soul from the End of the Last Century, 1847)
- Wiara słowiańska, czyli etyka piastująca wszechświat (The Slavic Faith, or the Ethics that Governs the Universe, 1847–48)
- Przedburza polityczna (The Approaching Political Storm, 1848).
- Die Freimaurerei in ihrem Wesen und Unwesen (German: The Freemasons..., 1873).
- Panteon wiedzy ludzkiej... (The Pantheon of Human Knowledge..., vols. 1–3, 1873–81).
- Bożyca (The God Book, fragments, 1965).

== See also ==
- History of philosophy in Poland
- List of Poles
