= Piechy =

- Village
- Location within Poland
- Coordinates: 51°40′13″N 23°14′33″E
- Country: Poland
- Voivodeship: Lublin
- County: Parczew
- Gmina: Podedwórze

Piechy [ˈpjɛxɨ] is a village in the administrative district of Gmina Podedwórze, within Parczew County, Lublin Voivodeship, in eastern Poland.
