= Nowe Mosty, Lublin Voivodeship =

Nowe Mosty
- Village
- Location within Poland
- Coordinates: 51°39′55″N 23°17′6″E
- Country: Poland
- Voivodeship: Lublin
- County: Parczew
- Gmina: Podedwórze

Nowe Mosty [ˈnɔvɛ ˈmɔstɨ] ("New Bridges") is a village in the administrative district of Gmina Podedwórze, within Parczew County, Lublin Voivodeship, in eastern Poland.
