= Bojary (disambiguation) =

Bojary is a district of Białystok, Poland.

Bojary may also refer to the following villages:

- Bojary, Podlaskie Voivodeship (north-east Poland)
- Bojary, Lublin Voivodeship (east Poland)
- Bojary, Masovian Voivodeship (east-central Poland)
- Bojary, Pomeranian Voivodeship (north Poland)
