= Dąbrowa, Gmina Annopol =

Dąbrowa
- Village
- Location within Poland
- Coordinates: 50°52′57″N 21°55′38″E
- Country: Poland
- Voivodeship: Lublin
- County: Kraśnik
- Gmina: Annopol

Population
  - Total: 360

Dąbrowa [dɔmˈbrɔva] is a village in the administrative district of Gmina Annopol, within Kraśnik County, Lublin Voivodeship, in eastern Poland.
