= Gmina Annopol =

Gmina Annopol Annopol Commune
- Gmina
- Coat of arms
- Interactive map of Gmina Annopol
- Coordinates (Annopol): 50°53′N 21°52′E
- Country: Poland
- Voivodeship: Lublin
- County: Kraśnik
- Seat: Annopol

Area
  - Total: 151.07 km^{2} (58.33 sq mi)

Population (2013)
  - Total: 9,036
  - Density: 59.81/km^{2} (154.9/sq mi)
  - Urban: 2,664
  - Rural: 6,372
- Website: http://www.annopol.info/

Gmina Annopol is an urban-rural gmina (administrative district) in Kraśnik County, Lublin Voivodeship, in eastern Poland. Its seat is the town of Annopol, which lies approximately 25 kilometres (16 mi) west of Kraśnik and 64 km (40 mi) south-west of the regional capital Lublin.

The gmina covers an area of 151.07 square kilometres (58.3 sq mi), and as of 2006 its total population is 9,359 (of which the population of Annopol is 2,690, and the population of the rural part of the gmina is 6,669).

== Villages ==
Apart from the town of Annopol, Gmina Annopol contains the villages and settlements of Anielin, Annopol-Rachów, Baraki, Bliskowice, Bliskowice-Niedbałki, Borów, Dąbrowa, Grabówka, Grabówka Ukazowa, Grabówka Ukazowa-Hamówka, Grabówka-Kolonia, Huta, Jakubowice, Janiszów, Kopiec, Kosin, Natalin, Nowy Rachów, Opoczka Mała, Opoka Duża, Opoka-Kolonia, Opoka-Kolonia Józefin, Opoka-Kolonia Michalin, Popów, Stary Rachów, Sucha Wólka, Świeciechów Duży, Świeciechów Poduchowny, Świeciechów Poduchowny-Lasek, Świeciechów Poduchowny-Zychówki, Wymysłów, Zabełcze, Zastocze, and Zofipole.

== Neighbouring gminas ==
Gmina Annopol is bordered by the gminas of Dzierzkowice, Gościeradów, Józefów nad Wisłą, Ożarów, Radomyśl nad Sanem, Tarłów, and Zawichost.
