= Popów, Lublin Voivodeship =

Popów
- Village
- Location within Poland
- Coordinates: 50°58′17″N 21°50′11″E
- Country: Poland
- Voivodeship: Lublin
- County: Kraśnik
- Gmina: Annopol

Population
  - Total: 270

Popów [ˈpɔpuf] is a village in the administrative district of Gmina Annopol, within Kraśnik County, Lublin Voivodeship, in eastern Poland.
