= Mosty, Lublin Voivodeship =

Mosty
- Village
- Location within Poland
- Coordinates: 51°39′15″N 23°16′47″E
- Country: Poland
- Voivodeship: Lublin
- County: Parczew
- Gmina: Podedwórze

Mosty [ˈmɔstɨ] is a village in the administrative district of Gmina Podedwórze, within Parczew County, Lublin Voivodeship, in eastern Poland.
