= Sucha Wólka =

- Village
- Location within Poland
- Coordinates: 50°55′N 21°55′E
- Country: Poland
- Voivodeship: Lublin
- County: Kraśnik
- Gmina: Annopol

Sucha Wólka [ˈsuxa ˈvulka] is a village in the administrative district of Gmina Annopol, within Kraśnik County, Lublin Voivodeship, in eastern Poland.
