= Wilczków, Gmina Malczyce =

Wilczków
- Village
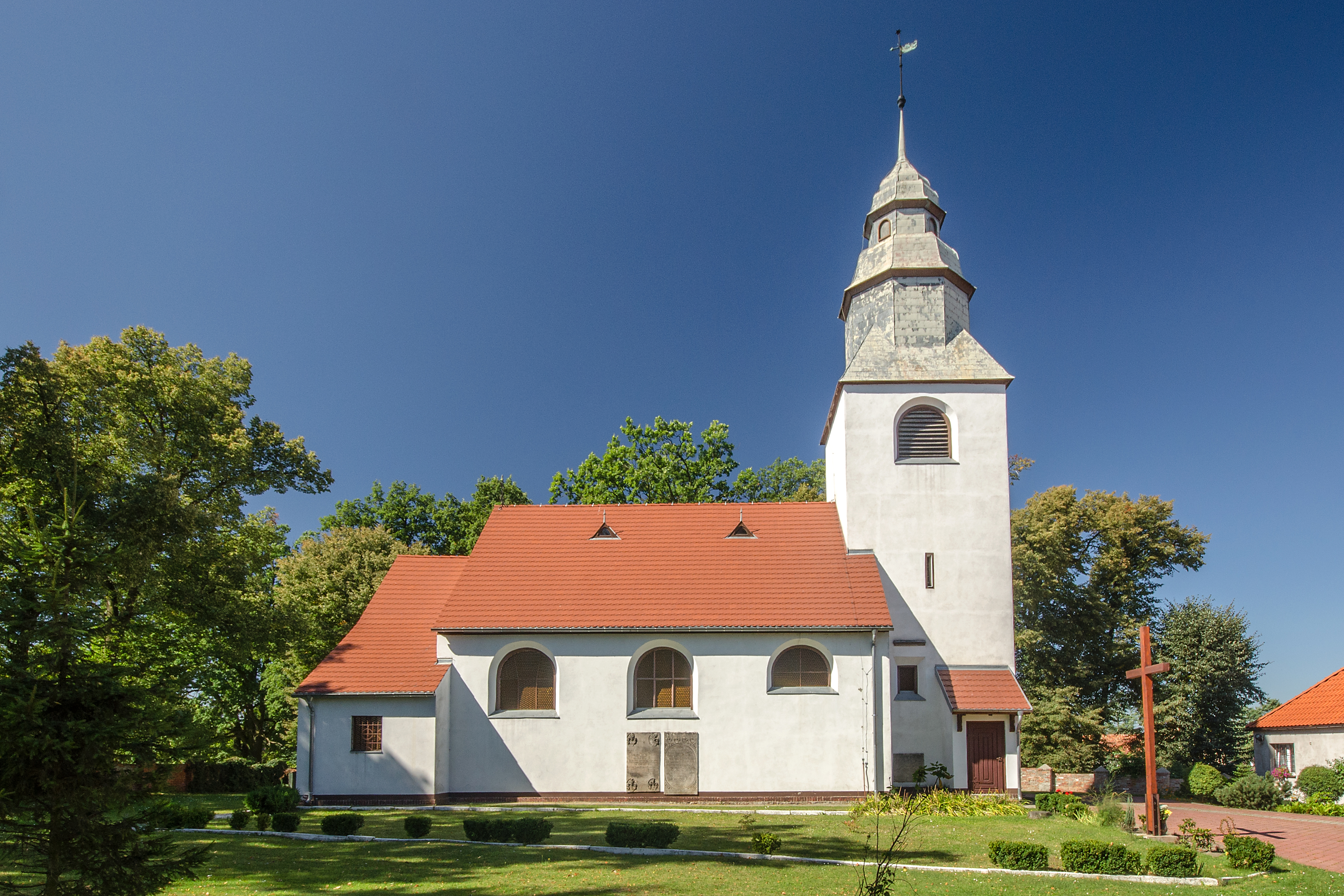
- Catholic church

- Location within Poland
- Coordinates: 51°11′19″N 16°29′57″E
- Country: Poland
- Voivodeship: Lower Silesian
- County: Środa
- Gmina: Malczyce

Wilczków [ˈvilt͡ʂkuf] is a village in the administrative district of Gmina Malczyce, within Środa County, Lower Silesian Voivodeship, in south-western Poland.
