= Rusko, Gmina Malczyce =

Rusko
- Village
- Location within Poland
- Coordinates: 51°12′5″N 16°28′44″E
- Country: Poland
- Voivodeship: Lower Silesian
- County: Środa
- Gmina: Malczyce
- Time zone: UTC+1 (CET)
  - Summer (DST): UTC+2 (CEST)
- Vehicle registration: DSR

Rusko [ˈruskɔ] is a village (former town) in the administrative district of Gmina Malczyce, within Środa County, Lower Silesian Voivodeship, in south-western Poland.
