= Zofipole, Lublin Voivodeship =

Zofipole
- Village
- Location within Poland
- Coordinates: 50°58′11″N 21°52′52″E
- Country: Poland
- Voivodeship: Lublin
- County: Kraśnik
- Gmina: Annopol

Zofipole [zɔfʲiˈpɔlɛ] is a village in the administrative district of Gmina Annopol, within Kraśnik County, Lublin Voivodeship, in eastern Poland.
