= Grabówek =

Grabówek may refer to the following places:

- Grabówek, Gdynia (north Poland)
- Grabówek, Lubusz Voivodeship (west Poland)
- Grabówek, Ostrołęka County, Masovian Voivodeship (east-central Poland)
- Grabówek, Warsaw, Masovian Voivodeship (east-central Poland)
- Grabówek, Podlaskie Voivodeship (north-east Poland)
- Grabówek, Warmian-Masurian Voivodeship (north Poland)
