= Świeciechów Poduchowny-Zychówki =

- Village
- Location within Poland
- Coordinates: 50°55′17″N 21°52′36″E
- Country: Poland
- Voivodeship: Lublin
- County: Kraśnik
- Gmina: Annopol

Population
  - Total: 67

Świeciechów Poduchowny-Zychówki (Polish pronunciation: [ɕfjɛˈt͡ɕɛxuf pɔduˈxɔvnɨ zɨˈxufkʲi]) is a village in the administrative district of Gmina Annopol, within Kraśnik County, Lublin Voivodeship, in eastern Poland.
