= Szymanów, Gmina Malczyce =

Szymanów
- Village
- Location within Poland
- Coordinates: 51°8′5″N 16°28′25″E
- Country: Poland
- Voivodeship: Lower Silesian
- County: Środa
- Gmina: Malczyce

Szymanów (Polish: [ʂɨˈmanuf]) is a village in the administrative district of Gmina Malczyce, within Środa County, Lower Silesian Voivodeship, in south-western Poland.
