= Dębice, Lower Silesian Voivodeship =

Dębice
- Village
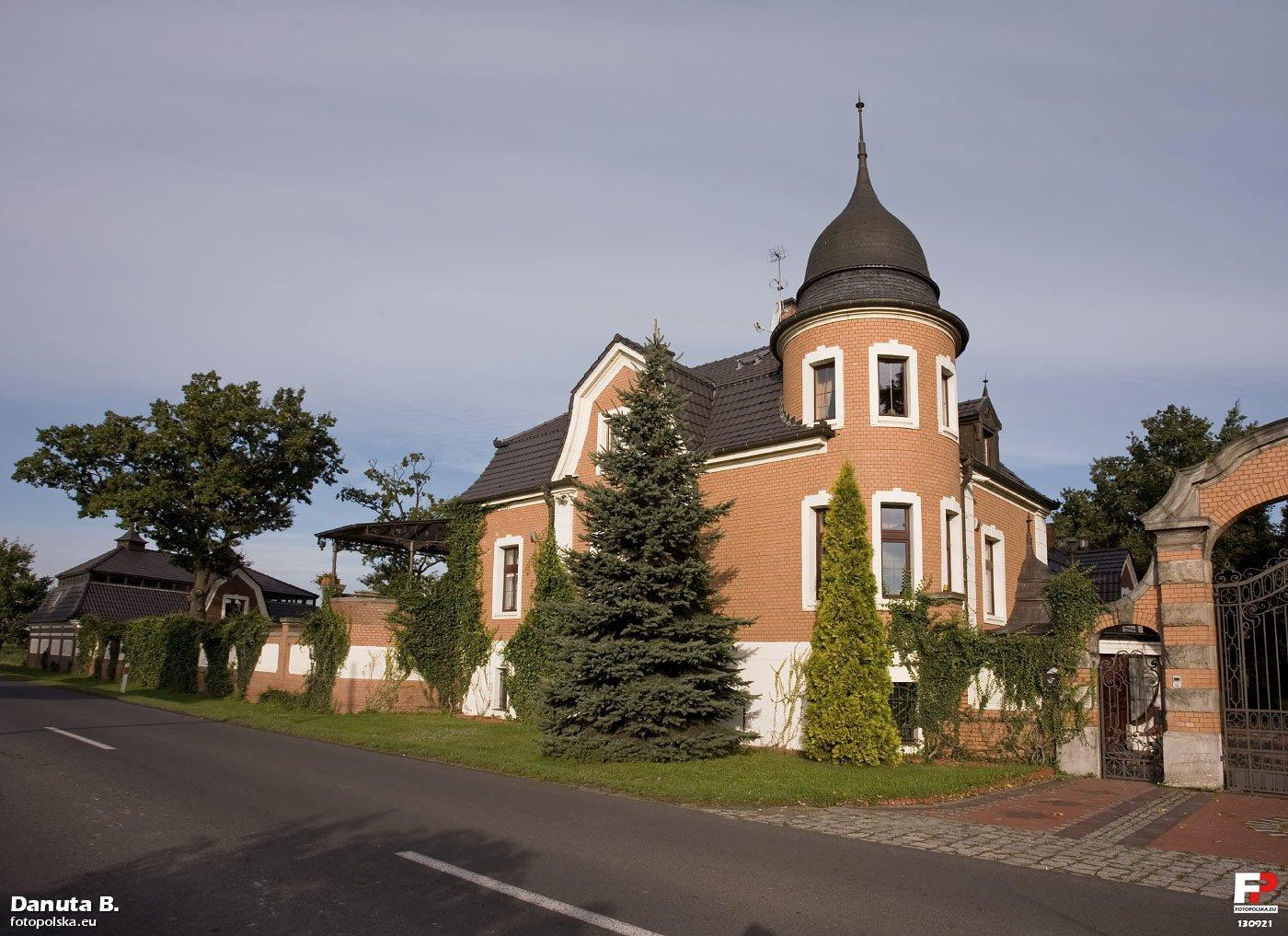
- Palace

- Location within Poland
- Coordinates: 51°09′10″N 16°29′06″E
- Country: Poland
- Voivodeship: Lower Silesian
- County: Środa
- Gmina: Malczyce

Dębice [dɛmˈbit͡sɛ] (German: Dambritsch) is a village in the administrative district of Gmina Malczyce, within Środa County, Lower Silesian Voivodeship, in south-western Poland.
