= Podedwórze =

- Village
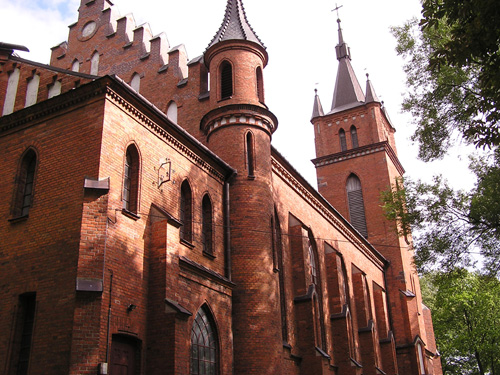
- Exaltation of the Holy Cross church

- Location within Poland
- Coordinates: 51°41′14″N 23°11′59″E
- Country: Poland
- Voivodeship: Lublin
- County: Parczew
- Gmina: Podedwórze
- Population: 493

Podedwórze [pɔdɛdˈvuʐɛ] is a village in Parczew County, Lublin Voivodeship, in eastern Poland. It is the seat of the gmina (administrative district) called Gmina Podedwórze.
