= Anielin, Kraśnik County =

Anielin
- Village
- Location within Poland
- Coordinates: 50°55′56″N 21°54′54″E
- Country: Poland
- Voivodeship: Lublin
- County: Kraśnik
- Gmina: Annopol

Population
  - Total: 130

Anielin [aˈɲɛlʲin] is a village in the administrative district of Gmina Annopol, within Kraśnik County, Lublin Voivodeship, in eastern Poland.
