= Mazurowice =

- Village
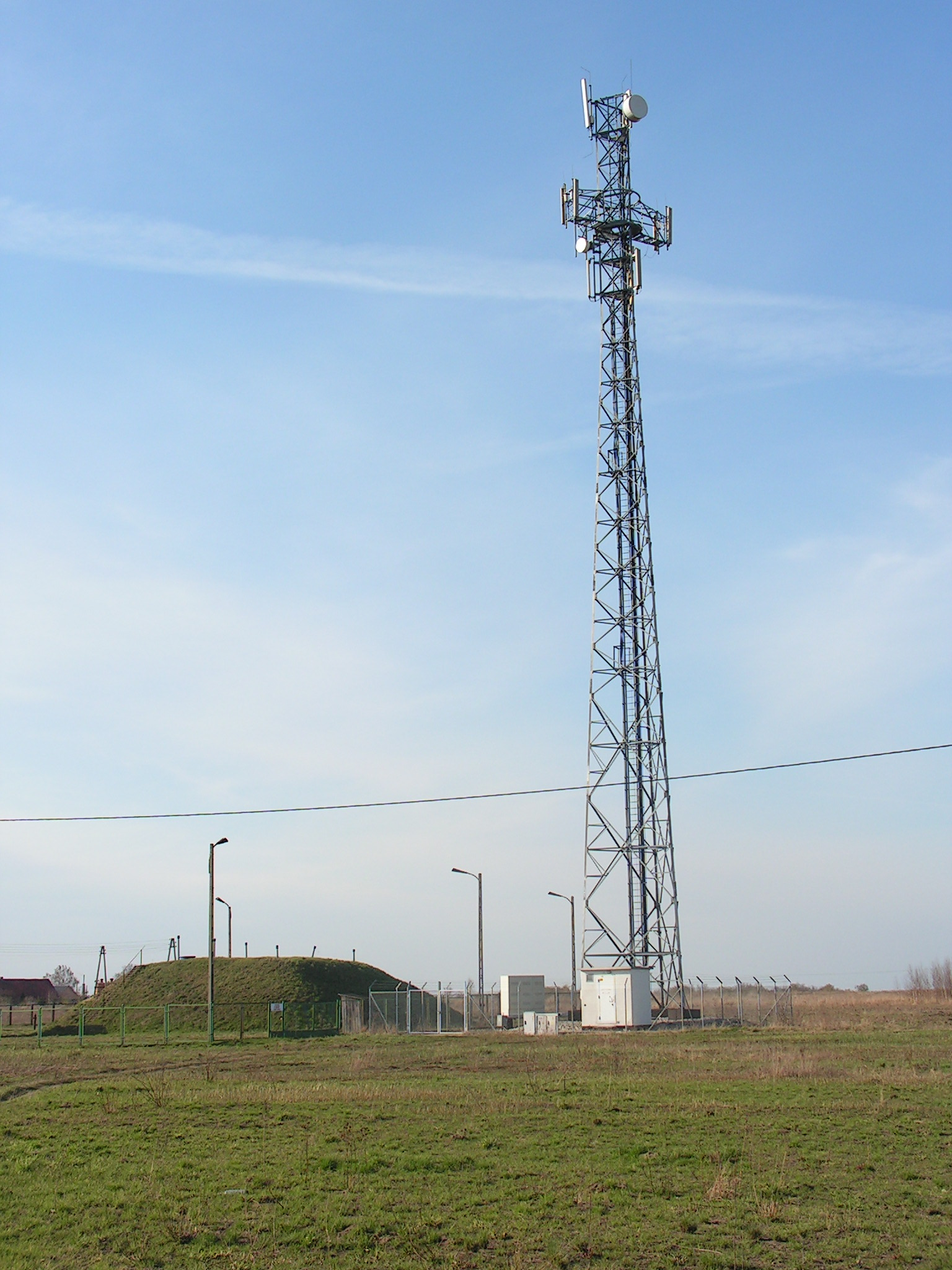

- Location within Poland
- Coordinates: 51°12′42″N 16°27′48″E
- Country: Poland
- Voivodeship: Lower Silesian
- County: Środa
- Gmina: Malczyce

Mazurowice [mazurɔˈvit͡sɛ] is a village in the administrative district of Gmina Malczyce, within Środa County, Lower Silesian Voivodeship, in south-western Poland.
