= Grabówka-Kolonia, Lublin Voivodeship =

Grabówka-Kolonia
- Village
- Location within Poland
- Coordinates: 50°56′16″N 21°57′39″E
- Country: Poland
- Voivodeship: Lublin
- County: Kraśnik
- Gmina: Annopol

Population
  - Total: 97

Grabówka-Kolonia [ɡraˈbufka kɔˈlɔɲa] is a village in the administrative district of Gmina Annopol, within Kraśnik County, Lublin Voivodeship, in eastern Poland.
