= Opoka-Kolonia Michalin =

- Village
- Location within Poland
- Coordinates: 50°52′00″N 21°53′20″E
- Country: Poland
- Voivodeship: Lublin
- County: Kraśnik
- Gmina: Annopol

Population
  - Total: 17

Opoka-Kolonia Michalin (Polish pronunciation: [ɔˈpɔka kɔˈlɔɲa miˈxalin]) is a village in the administrative district of Gmina Annopol, within Kraśnik County, Lublin Voivodeship, in eastern Poland.
