= Zabełcze, Lublin Voivodeship =

Zabełcze
- Village
- Location within Poland
- Coordinates: 50°50′20″N 21°51′43″E
- Country: Poland
- Voivodeship: Lublin
- County: Kraśnik
- Gmina: Annopol

Population
  - Total: 110

Zabełcze [zaˈbɛu̯t͡ʂɛ] is a village in the administrative district of Gmina Annopol, within Kraśnik County, Lublin Voivodeship, in eastern Poland.
