= Chełm, Gmina Malczyce =

Chełm
- Village
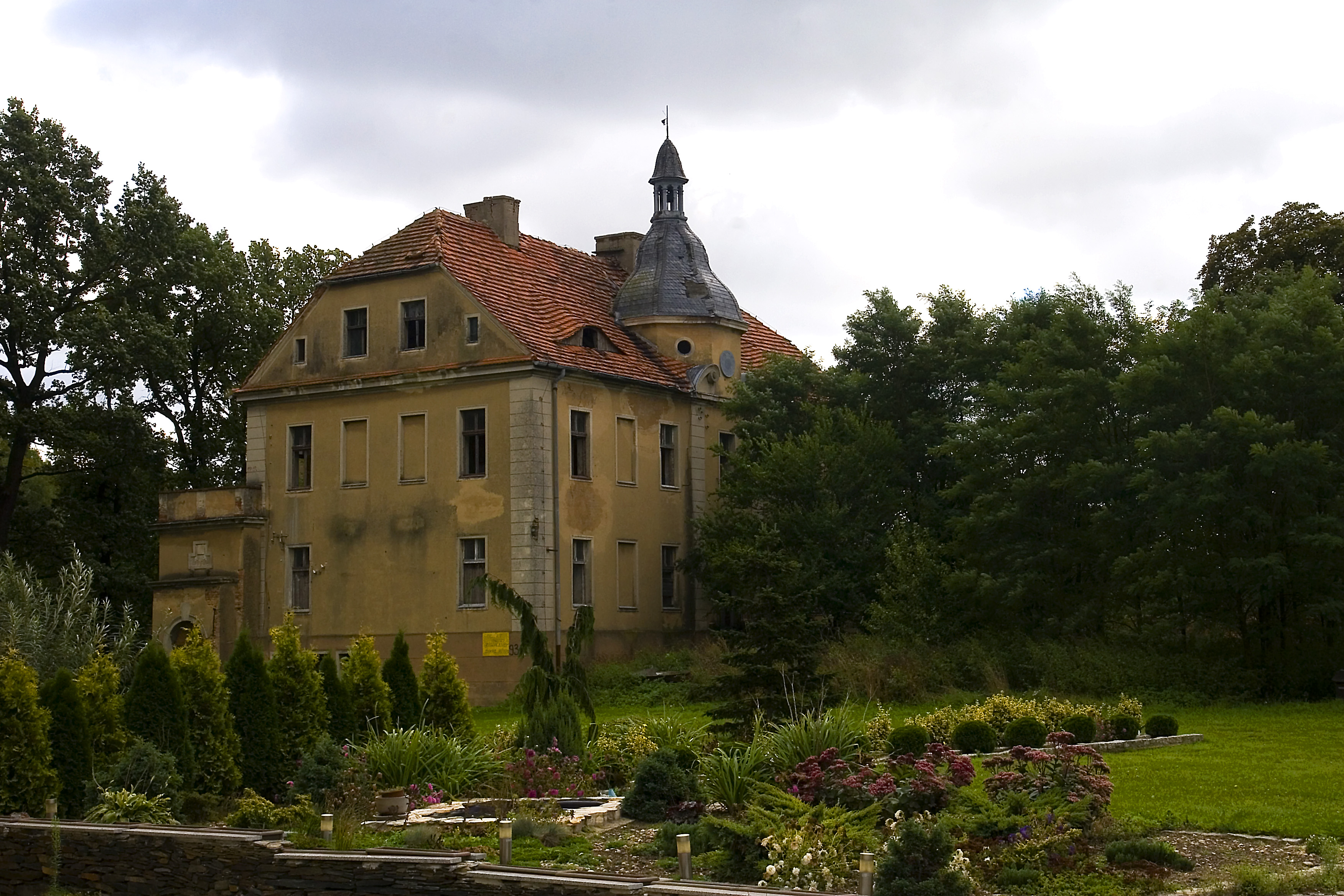
- Chełm Palace

- Location within Poland
- Coordinates: 51°07′43″N 16°27′37″E
- Country: Poland
- Voivodeship: Lower Silesian
- County: Środa
- Gmina: Malczyce
- Time zone: UTC+1 (CET)
  - Summer (DST): UTC+2 (CEST)
- Vehicle registration: DSR

Chełm (Polish pronunciation: [xɛwm]; German: Hulm) is a village in the administrative district of Gmina Malczyce, within Środa County, Lower Silesian Voivodeship, in south-western Poland.

== History ==
The area became part of the emerging Polish state in the 10th century. Centuries later it passed to Bohemia (Czechia), Prussia and Germany. It became again part of Poland following Germany's defeat in World War II in 1945.

== Transport ==
The Voivodeship road 345 (road of regional importance) passes through Chełm, and the Polish A4 motorway runs nearby, southwest of the village.
