= Nowy Rachów =

- Village
- Location within Poland
- Coordinates: 50°53′55″N 21°52′40″E
- Country: Poland
- Voivodeship: Lublin
- County: Kraśnik
- Gmina: Annopol

Population
  - Total: 250

Nowy Rachów [ˈnɔvɨ ˈraxuf] is a village in the administrative district of Gmina Annopol, within Kraśnik County, Lublin Voivodeship, in eastern Poland.
