= Zawadka, Lower Silesian Voivodeship =

Zawadka
- Village
- Location within Poland
- Coordinates: 51°08′11″N 16°27′20″E
- Country: Poland
- Voivodeship: Lower Silesian
- County: Środa
- Gmina: Malczyce

Zawadka [zaˈvatka] is a village in the administrative district of Gmina Malczyce, within Środa County, Lower Silesian Voivodeship, in south-western Poland.
