= Opoka-Kolonia =

- Village
- Location within Poland
- Coordinates: 50°52′2″N 21°53′9″E
- Country: Poland
- Voivodeship: Lublin
- County: Kraśnik
- Gmina: Annopol

Population
  - Total: 390

Opoka-Kolonia [ɔˈpɔka kɔˈlɔɲa] is a village in the administrative district of Gmina Annopol, within Kraśnik County, Lublin Voivodeship, in eastern Poland.
