= Gmina Malczyce =

Gmina Malczyce Malczyce Commune
- Gmina
- Flag Coat of arms
- Interactive map of Gmina Malczyce
- Coordinates (Malczyce): 51°13′N 16°29′E
- Country: Poland
- Voivodeship: Lower Silesian
- County: Środa
- Seat: Malczyce
- Sołectwos: Chełm, Chomiąża, Dębice, Kwietno, Malczyce, Mazurowice, Rachów, Rusko, Wilczków

Area
  - Total: 52.55 km^{2} (20.29 sq mi)

Population (2019-06-30)
  - Total: 5,957
  - Density: 113.4/km^{2} (293.6/sq mi)
- Website: http://www.malczyce.wroc.pl/

Gmina Malczyce is a rural gmina (administrative district) in Środa County, Lower Silesian Voivodeship, in south-western Poland. Its seat is the village of Malczyce, which lies approximately 11 kilometres (7 mi) to the north-west of Środa Śląska, and 41 kilometres (25 mi) west of the regional capital Wrocław. It is part of the Wrocław metropolitan area.

The gmina covers an area of 52.55 square kilometres (20.3 sq mi), and as of 2019 its total population was 5,957.

== Neighbouring gminas ==
Gmina Malczyce is bordered by the gminas of Prochowice, Ruja, Środa Śląska, Wądroże Wielkie and Wołów.

== Villages ==
The gmina contains the villages of Chełm, Chomiąża, Dębice, Kwietno, Malczyce, Mazurowice, Rachów, Rusko, Szymanów, Wilczków and Zawadka.
