= Opoczka Mała =

- Village
- Location within Poland
- Coordinates: 50°53′N 21°51′E
- Country: Poland
- Voivodeship: Lublin
- County: Kraśnik
- Gmina: Annopol

Opoczka Mała [ɔˈpɔt͡ʂka ˈmawa] is a village in the administrative district of Gmina Annopol, within Kraśnik County, Lublin Voivodeship, in eastern Poland.
