= Jakubowice, Lublin Voivodeship =

Jakubowice
- Village
- Location within Poland
- Coordinates: 50°53′27″N 21°50′5″E
- Country: Poland
- Voivodeship: Lublin
- County: Kraśnik
- Gmina: Annopol

Population
  - Total: 130

Jakubowice [jakubɔˈvʲit͡sɛ] is a village in the administrative district of Gmina Annopol, within Kraśnik County, Lublin Voivodeship, in eastern Poland.
