= Kwietno =

- Village
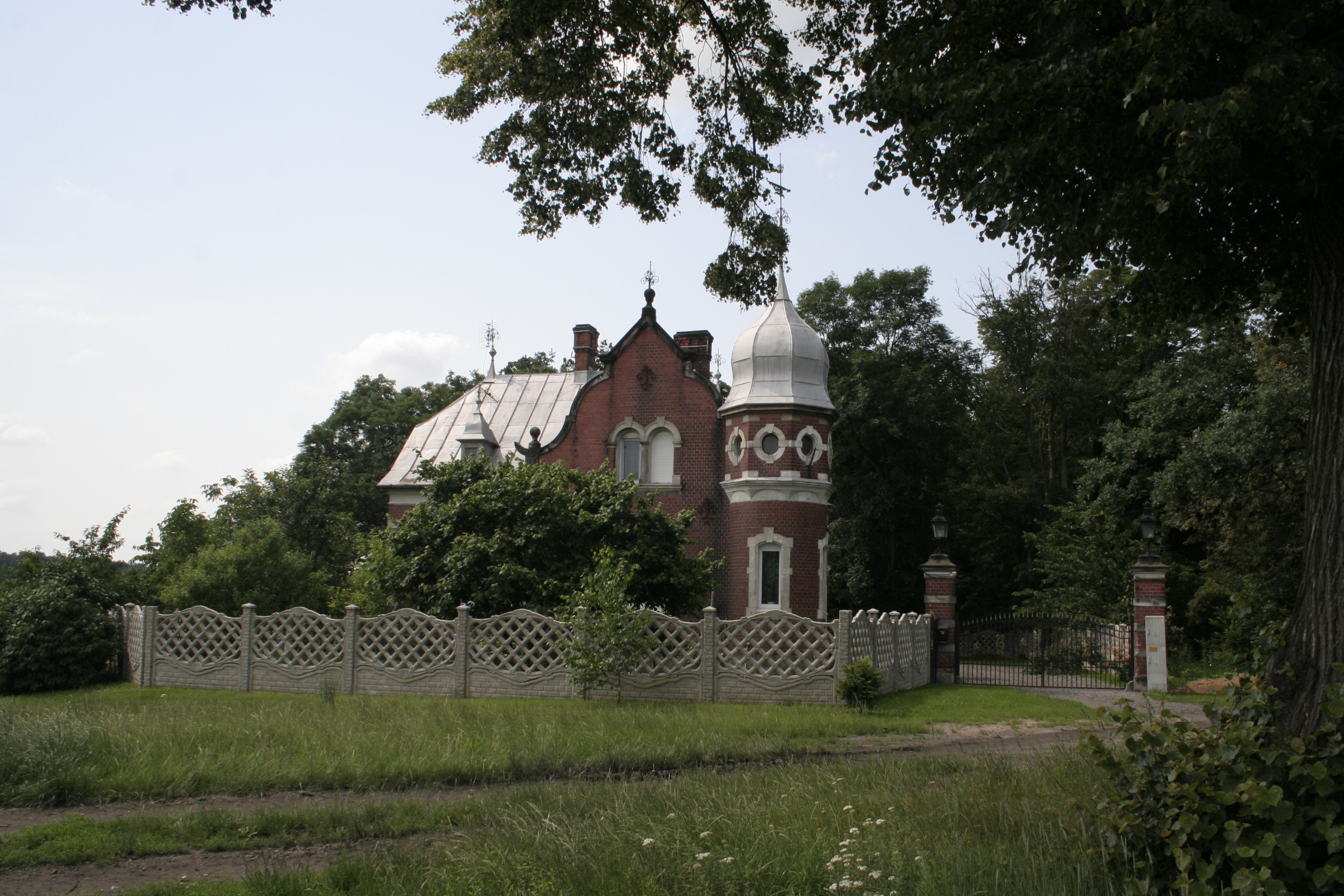
- Palace

- Location within Poland
- Coordinates: 51°10′N 16°28′E
- Country: Poland
- Voivodeship: Lower Silesian
- County: Środa
- Gmina: Malczyce
- Population: 400

Kwietno [ˈkfjɛtnɔ] is a village in the administrative district of Gmina Malczyce, within Środa County, Lower Silesian Voivodeship, in south-western Poland.
