= Kaniuki, Lublin Voivodeship =

Kaniuki
- Village
- Location within Poland
- Coordinates: 51°37′45″N 23°11′7″E
- Country: Poland
- Voivodeship: Lublin
- County: Parczew
- Gmina: Podedwórze
- Population: 23

Kaniuki [kaˈɲukʲi] is a village in the administrative district of Gmina Podedwórze, within Parczew County, Lublin Voivodeship, in eastern Poland.
