= Opoka Duża =

- Village
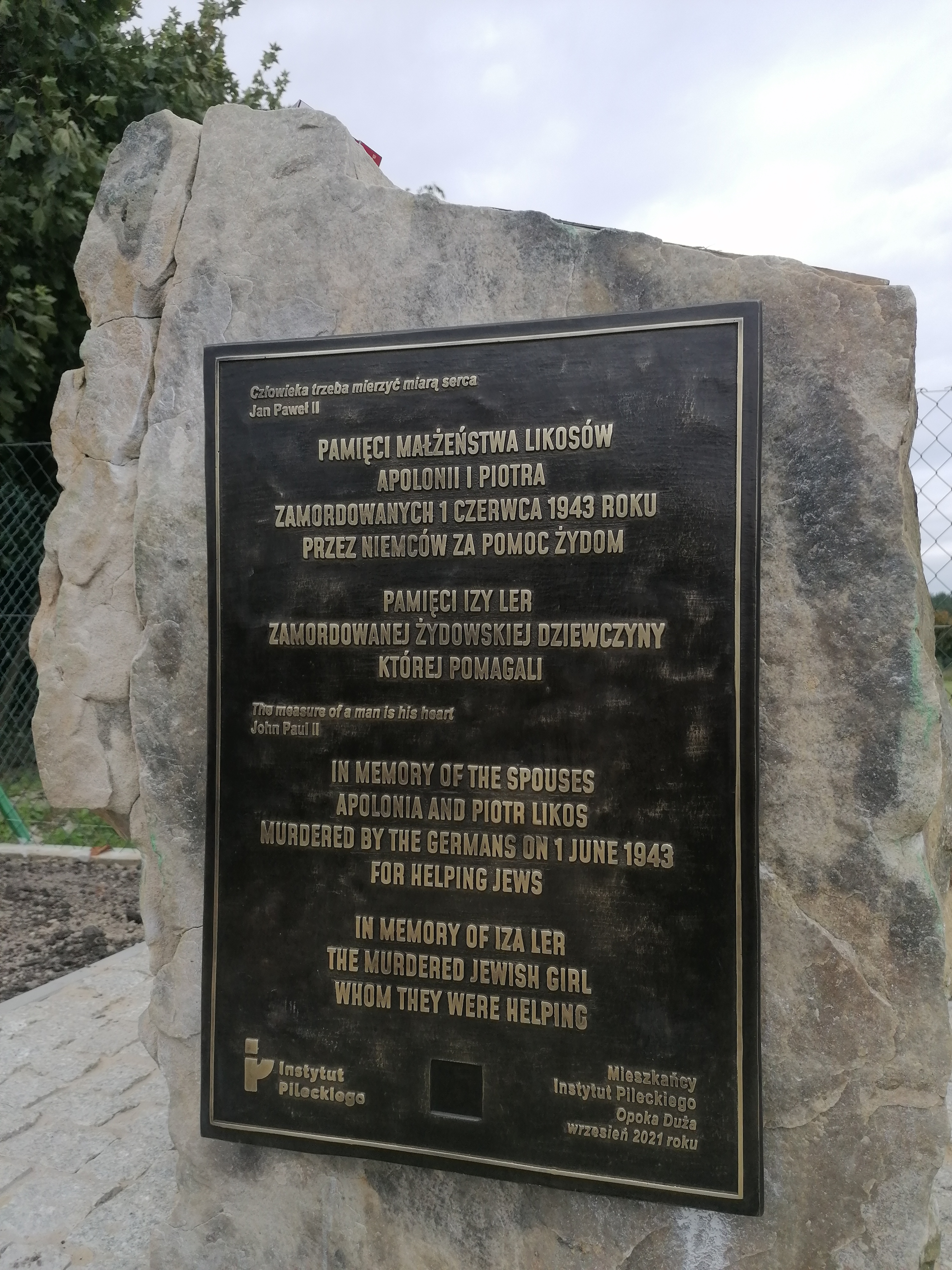
- Memorial to local Poles murdered by the German occupiers for rescuing Jews from the Holocaust during World War II

- Location within Poland
- Coordinates: 50°52′N 21°52′E
- Country: Poland
- Voivodeship: Lublin
- County: Kraśnik
- Gmina: Annopol

Opoka Duża [ɔˈpɔka ˈduʐa] is a village in the administrative district of Gmina Annopol, within Kraśnik County, Lublin Voivodeship, in eastern Poland.

== History ==
Three Polish citizens were murdered by Nazi Germany in the village during World War II.
