= Bliskowice-Niedbałki =

- Village
- Location within Poland
- Coordinates: 50°58′04″N 21°52′23″E
- Country: Poland
- Voivodeship: Lublin
- County: Kraśnik
- Gmina: Annopol

Population
  - Total: 17

Bliskowice-Niedbałki [bliskɔˈvit͡sɛ ɲɛdˈbau̯ki] is a village in the administrative district of Gmina Annopol, within Kraśnik County, Lublin Voivodeship, in eastern Poland.
