= Rusiły =

- Village
- Location within Poland
- Coordinates: 51°42′N 23°13′E
- Country: Poland
- Voivodeship: Lublin
- County: Parczew
- Gmina: Podedwórze
- Time zone: UTC+1 (CET)
  - Summer (DST): UTC+2 (CEST)

Rusiły [ruˈɕiwɨ] is a village in the administrative district of Gmina Podedwórze, within Parczew County, Lublin Voivodeship, in eastern Poland.

== History ==
19 Polish citizens were murdered by Nazi Germany in the village during World War II.
