= Niecielin =

- Village
- Location within Poland
- Coordinates: 51°41′36″N 23°15′29″E
- Country: Poland
- Voivodeship: Lublin
- County: Parczew
- Gmina: Podedwórze

Niecielin [ɲɛˈt͡ɕɛlin] is a village in the administrative district of Gmina Podedwórze, within Parczew County, Lublin Voivodeship, in eastern Poland.
