= Chełm Palace =

Historic palace in Chełm, Lower Silesian Voivodeship, Poland

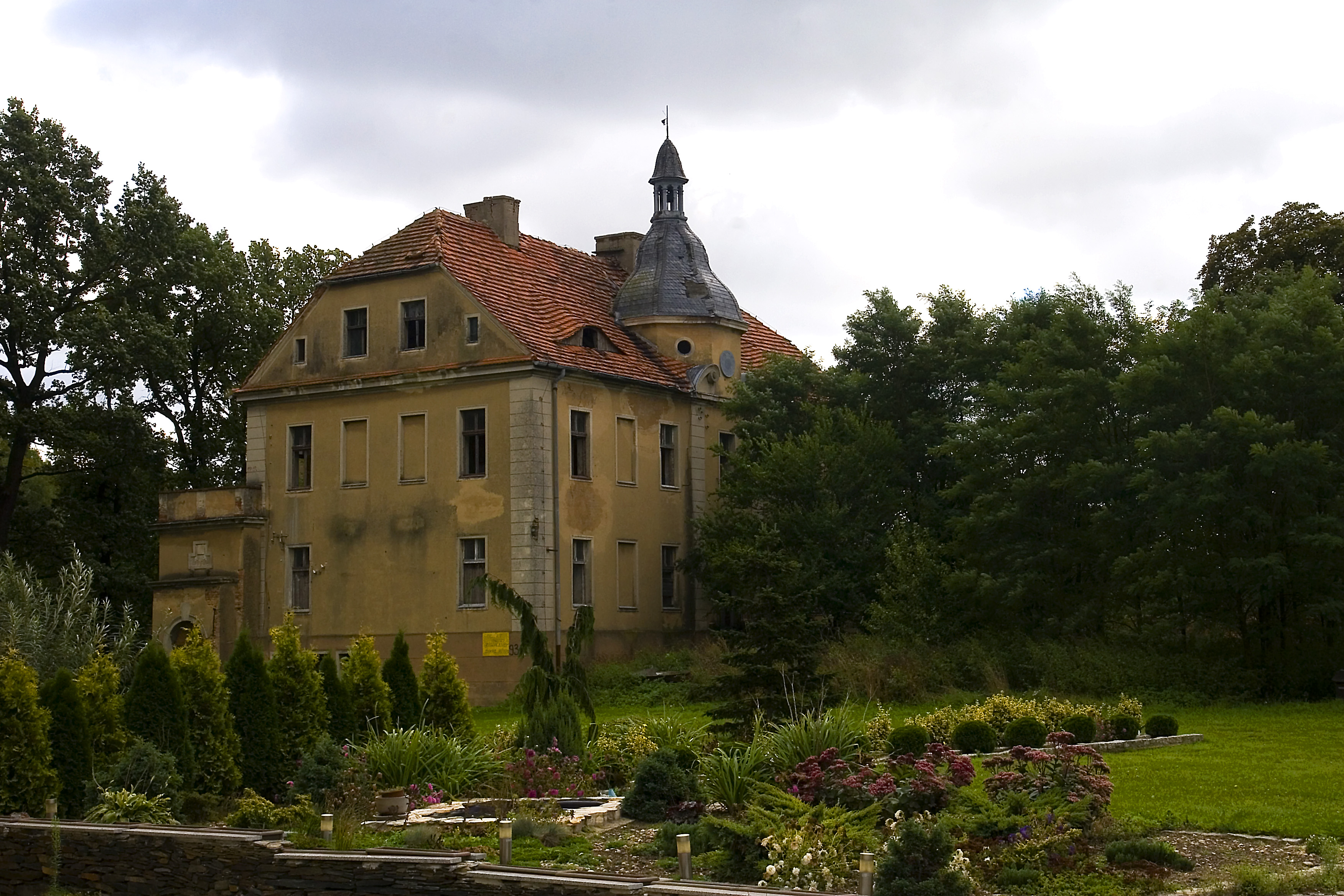
- The building in 2012.

- Location within Poland

General information
- Location: 3 Strzegomska Street, Chełm, Lower Silesian Voivodeship, Poland
- Coordinates: 51°07′42.75″N 16°27′43.03″E
- Completed: 1822
- Renovated: 1991

Technical details
- Floor count: 3

Design and construction
- Developer: August Wilhelm Rösser

The Chełm Palace (Polish pronunciation: [ˈxɛwm]; Polish: Pałac w Chełmie; German: Schloss Hulm) is a historic palace in the village of Chełm in Lower Silesian Voivodeship, Poland. It is placed at 3 Strzegomska Street. The building was constructed in 1822, in placed a Renaissance manor house from 1591. It is registered on the national heritage list.

== History ==
In 1591, a Renaissance manor house was built for Hans V von Rothkirch. In 1822, a palace was built in its place for August Wilhelm Rösser, which underwent further modifications at the turn of the 20th-century. The building placed onto the national heritage list in 1990, and renovated in 1991.

== Characteristics ==
The palace includes three storyes and a high semi-basement. It has a base formed in a shape of two rectangles joined together at a right angle. It features a half-hipped roof, and a eight-sided tower, topped with a tented roof and a raised dome over a lantern. The palace complex also includes a park and an outbuilding and a cowshed dating to the turn of the 20th century. The palace is registered on the national heritage list.
