= Bliskowice =

- Village
- Location within Poland
- Coordinates: 50°57′N 21°50′E
- Country: Poland
- Voivodeship: Lublin
- County: Kraśnik
- Gmina: Annopol

Population
  - Total: 310

Bliskowice [blʲiskɔˈvʲit͡sɛ] is a village in the administrative district of Gmina Annopol, within Kraśnik County, Lublin Voivodeship, in eastern Poland.
