= Borów, Kraśnik County =

Borów
- Village
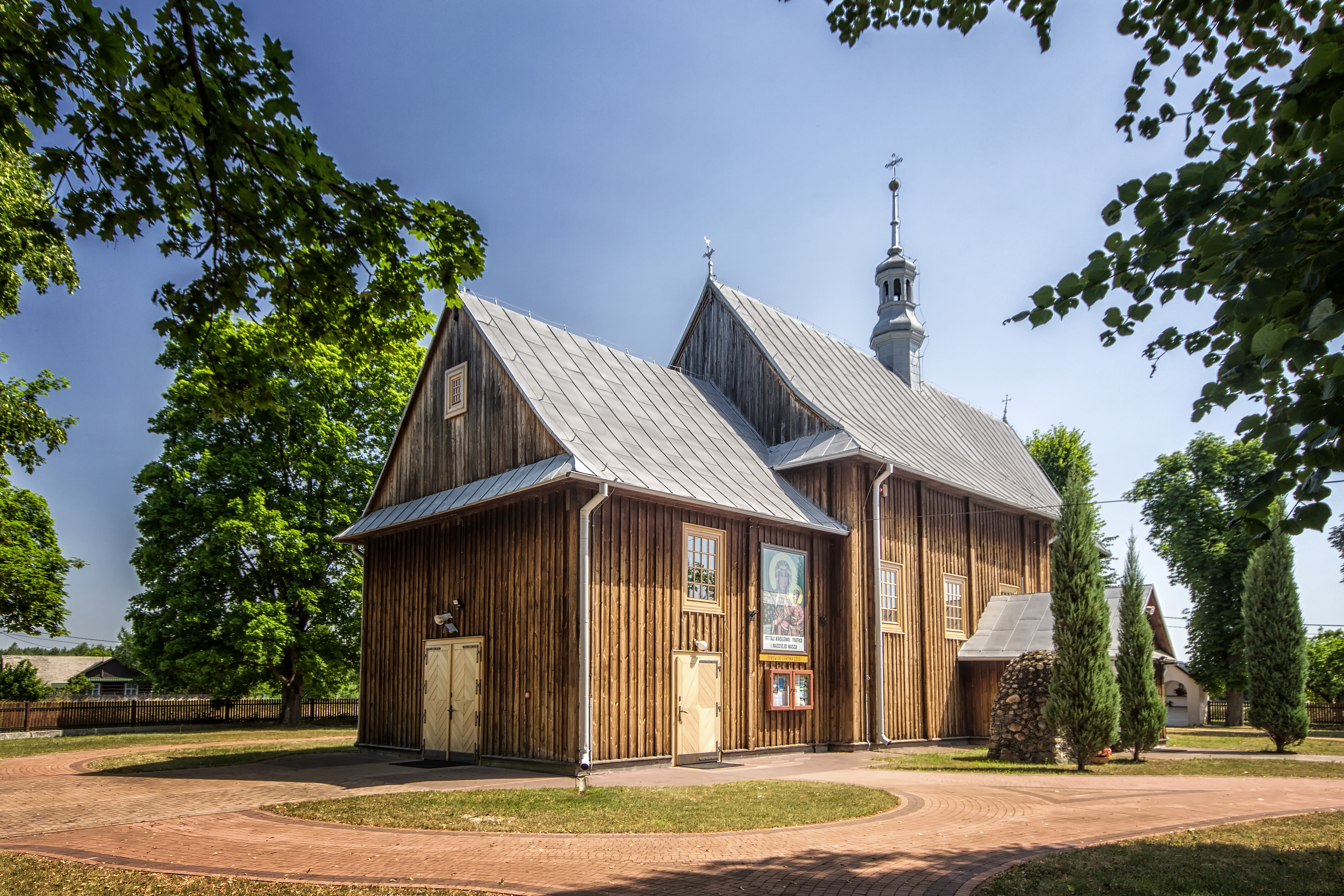
- Saints Andrew and Joseph church in Borów

- Location within Poland
- Coordinates: 50°48′N 21°55′E
- Country: Poland
- Voivodeship: Lublin
- County: Kraśnik
- Gmina: Annopol

Population
  - Total: 500
- Time zone: UTC+1 (CET)
  - Summer (DST): UTC+2 (CEST)
- Vehicle registration: LKR

Borów [ˈbɔruf] is a village in the administrative district of Gmina Annopol, within Kraśnik County, Lublin Voivodeship, in eastern Poland.

== History ==
During the German occupation (World War II), on 2 February 1944, the village was pacified by the occupiers. Some 300 Polish inhabitants were massacred in reprisal for their support for the Polish resistance movement. There is a memorial in the village.
