= Świeciechów Poduchowny-Lasek =

- Village
- Location within Poland
- Coordinates: 50°55′20″N 21°50′33″E
- Country: Poland
- Voivodeship: Lublin
- County: Kraśnik
- Gmina: Annopol

Population
  - Total: 80

Świeciechów Poduchowny-Lasek (Polish pronunciation: [ɕfjɛˈt͡ɕɛxuf pɔduˈxɔvnɨ ˈlasɛk]) is a village in the administrative district of Gmina Annopol, within Kraśnik County, Lublin Voivodeship, in eastern Poland.
