= Zaliszcze =

- Village
- Location within Poland
- Coordinates: 51°39′N 23°9′E
- Country: Poland
- Voivodeship: Lublin
- County: Parczew
- Gmina: Podedwórze

Zaliszcze [zaˈliʂt͡ʂɛ] is a village in the administrative district of Gmina Podedwórze, within Parczew County, Lublin Voivodeship, in eastern Poland.
