= Natalin, Gmina Annopol =

Natalin
- Village
- Location within Poland
- Coordinates: 50°57′22″N 21°54′8″E
- Country: Poland
- Voivodeship: Lublin
- County: Kraśnik
- Gmina: Annopol

Population
  - Total: 200

Natalin [naˈtalʲin] is a village in the administrative district of Gmina Annopol, within Kraśnik County, Lublin Voivodeship, in eastern Poland.
