= Huta, Kraśnik County =

Huta
- Village
- Location within Poland
- Coordinates: 50°53′34″N 21°54′46″E
- Country: Poland
- Voivodeship: Lublin
- County: Kraśnik
- Gmina: Annopol

Population
  - Total: 160

Huta [ˈxuta] is a village in the administrative district of Gmina Annopol, within Kraśnik County, Lublin Voivodeship, in eastern Poland.
