= Grabówek, Gdynia =

Grabówek
- District of Gdynia
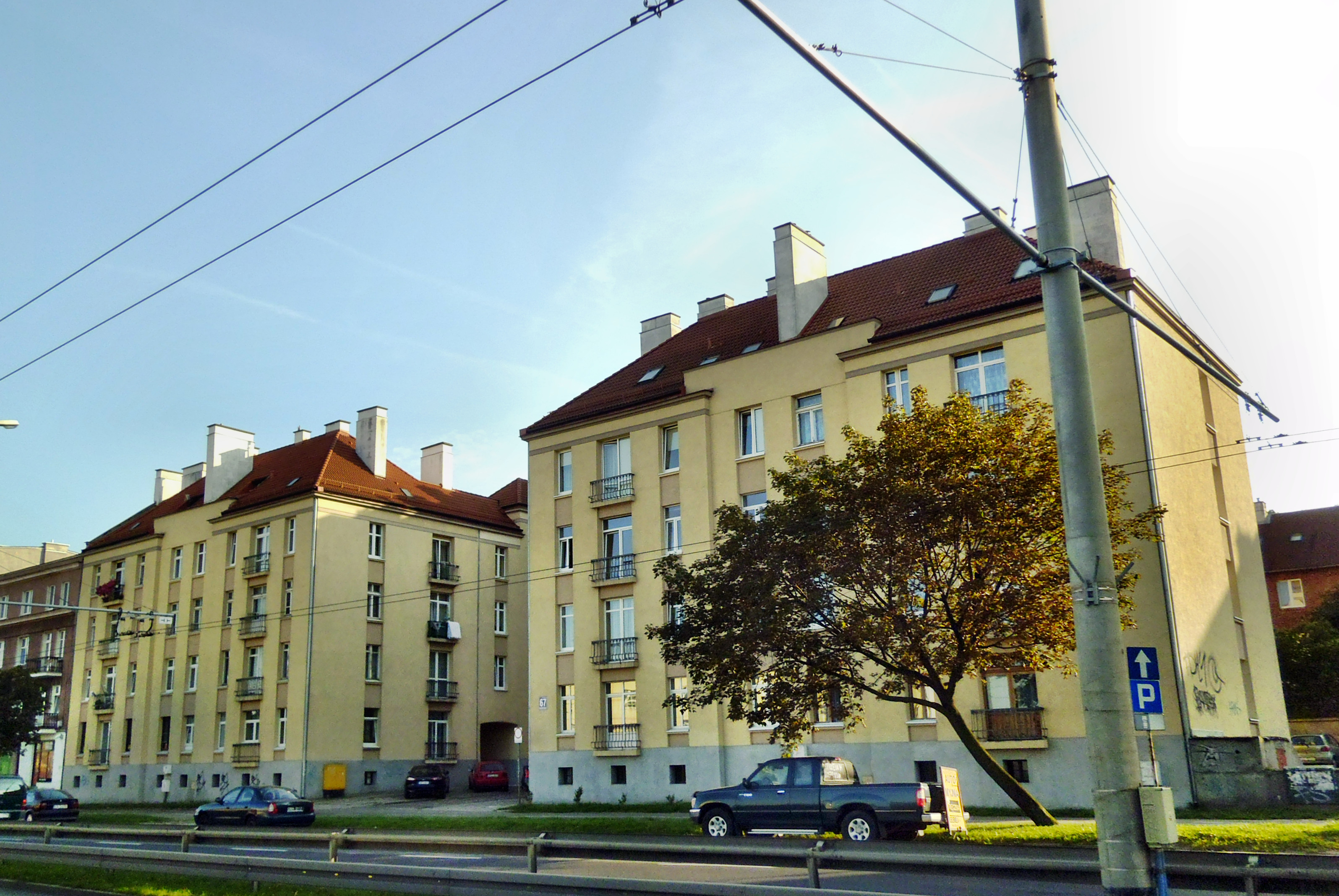

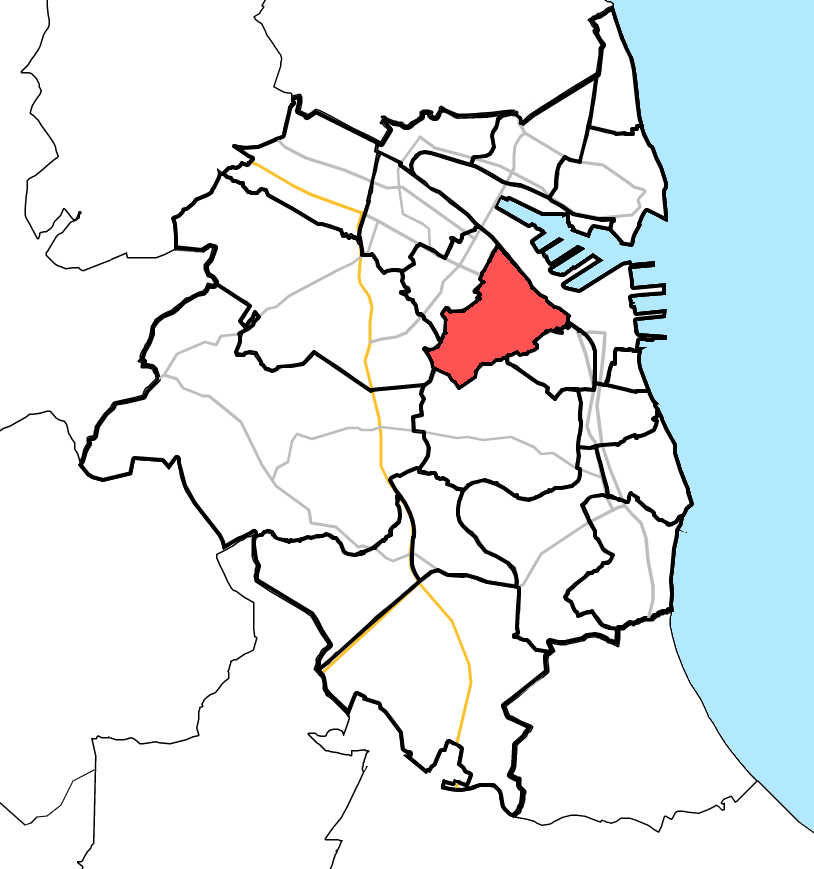
- Location of Grabówek within Gdynia
- Coordinates: 54.52520°N 18.50970°E
- Country: Poland
- Voivodeship: Pomeranian
- County/City: Gdynia
- Within city limits: 1930

Area
  - Total: 4.38 km^{2} (1.69 sq mi)

Population (2022)
  - Total: 7,985
  - Density: 1,820/km^{2} (4,720/sq mi)
- Time zone: UTC+1 (CET)
  - Summer (DST): UTC+2 (CEST)
- Vehicle registration: GA

Grabówek [ɡraˈbuvɛk] is a district of Gdynia, Poland, located in the central part of the city.

The Gdynia Maritime University is based in Grabówek.

== History ==
Grabówek was once a possession of the Carthusian Monastery in Kartuzy, administratively located in the Puck County in the Pomeranian Voivodeship of the Kingdom of Poland.

In May 1937, Spanish refugees from the Spanish Civil War, evacuated to Poland after being granted asylum by the Polish Embassy in Madrid, were received in Grabówek (see also Poland–Spain relations).

During the German occupation of Poland in World War II, it was the location of an Einsatzgruppen-operated penal camp.
