= Bojary, Lublin Voivodeship =

Bojary
- Village
- Location within Poland
- Coordinates: 51°40′30″N 23°16′1″E
- Country: Poland
- Voivodeship: Lublin
- County: Parczew
- Gmina: Podedwórze
- Population (approx.): 30

Bojary [bɔˈjarɨ] is a village in the administrative district of Gmina Podedwórze, within Parczew County, Lublin Voivodeship, in eastern Poland.
