= Grabówka, Parczew County =

Grabówka
- Village
- Location within Poland
- Coordinates: 51°41′5″N 23°16′12″E
- Country: Poland
- Voivodeship: Lublin
- County: Parczew
- Gmina: Podedwórze

Grabówka [ɡraˈbufka] is a village in the administrative district of Gmina Podedwórze, within Parczew County, Lublin Voivodeship, in eastern Poland.
