= Grabówka Ukazowa =

- Village
- Location within Poland
- Coordinates: 50°56′46″N 21°55′24″E
- Country: Poland
- Voivodeship: Lublin
- County: Kraśnik
- Gmina: Annopol

Population
  - Total: 190

Grabówka Ukazowa [ɡraˈbufka ukaˈzɔva] is a village in the administrative district of Gmina Annopol, within Kraśnik County, Lublin Voivodeship, in eastern Poland.
