= Malczyce =

- Village
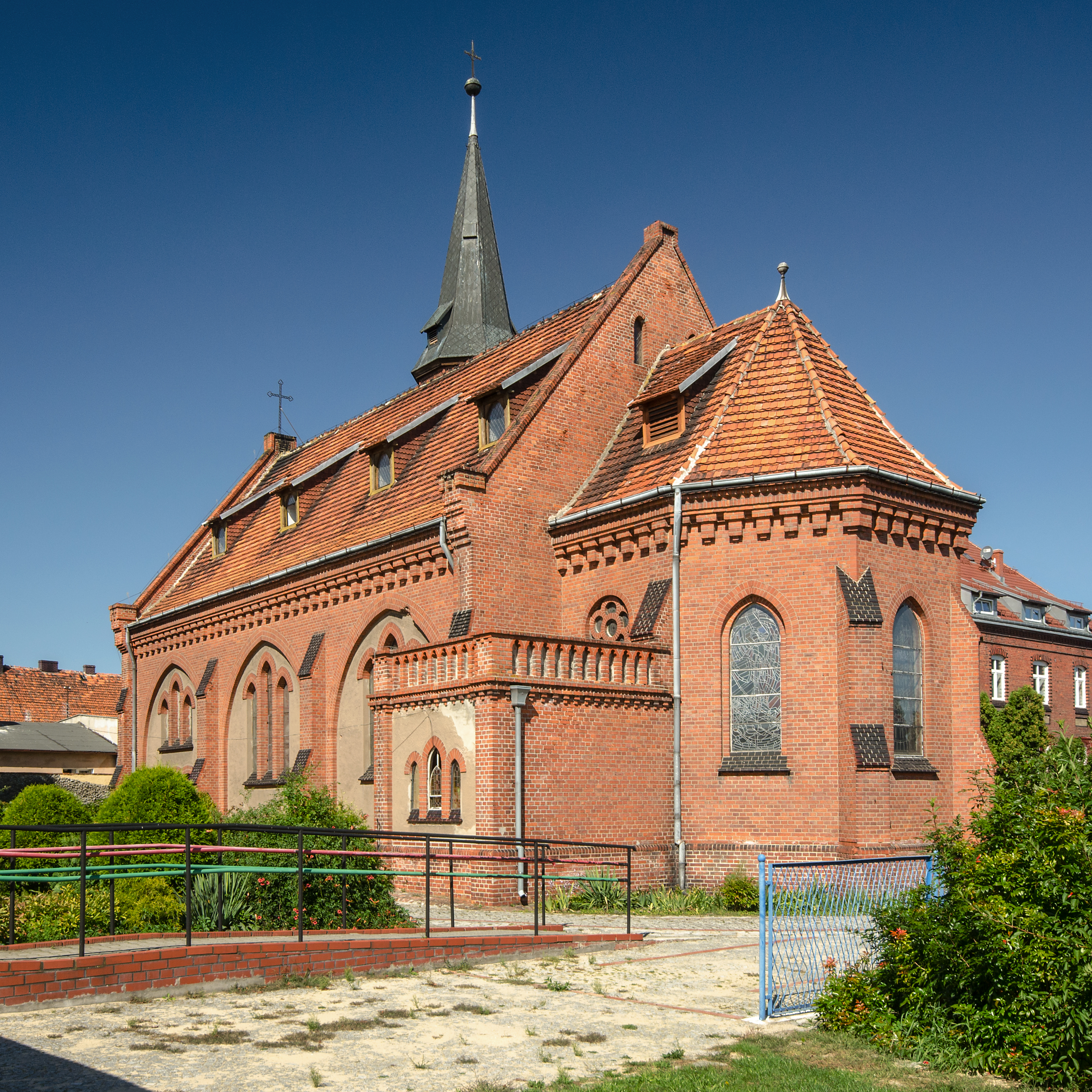
- Immaculate Conception church in Malczyce

- Location within Poland
- Coordinates: 51°13′14″N 16°29′37″E
- Country: Poland
- Voivodeship: Lower Silesian
- County: Środa
- Gmina: Malczyce

Population
  - Total: 3,100
- Time zone: UTC+1 (CET)
  - Summer (DST): UTC+2 (CEST)
- Vehicle registration: DSR
- Website: http://www.malczyce.com

Malczyce (Polish pronunciation: [malˈt͡ʂɨt͡sɛ]) is a village in Środa County, Lower Silesian Voivodeship, in south-western Poland, situated on the south-west bank of the river Oder (Odra). It is the seat of Gmina Malczyce.

== History ==
During World War II, the Germans operated two forced labour subcamps of the Stalag VIII-C prisoner-of-war camp in the settlement.

== See also ==
- Średzka Woda
