= Opole, Lublin Voivodeship =

Opole
- Village
- Location within Poland
- Coordinates: 51°41′0″N 23°13′16″E
- Country: Poland
- Voivodeship: Lublin
- County: Parczew
- Gmina: Podedwórze

Population
  - Total: 192
- Time zone: UTC+1 (CET)
  - Summer (DST): UTC+2 (CEST)

Opole [ɔˈpɔlɛ] is a village in the administrative district of Gmina Podedwórze, within Parczew County, Lublin Voivodeship, in eastern Poland.

== History ==
Five Polish citizens were murdered by Nazi Germany in the village during World War II.
