= Chomiąża, Lower Silesian Voivodeship =

Chomiąża
- Village
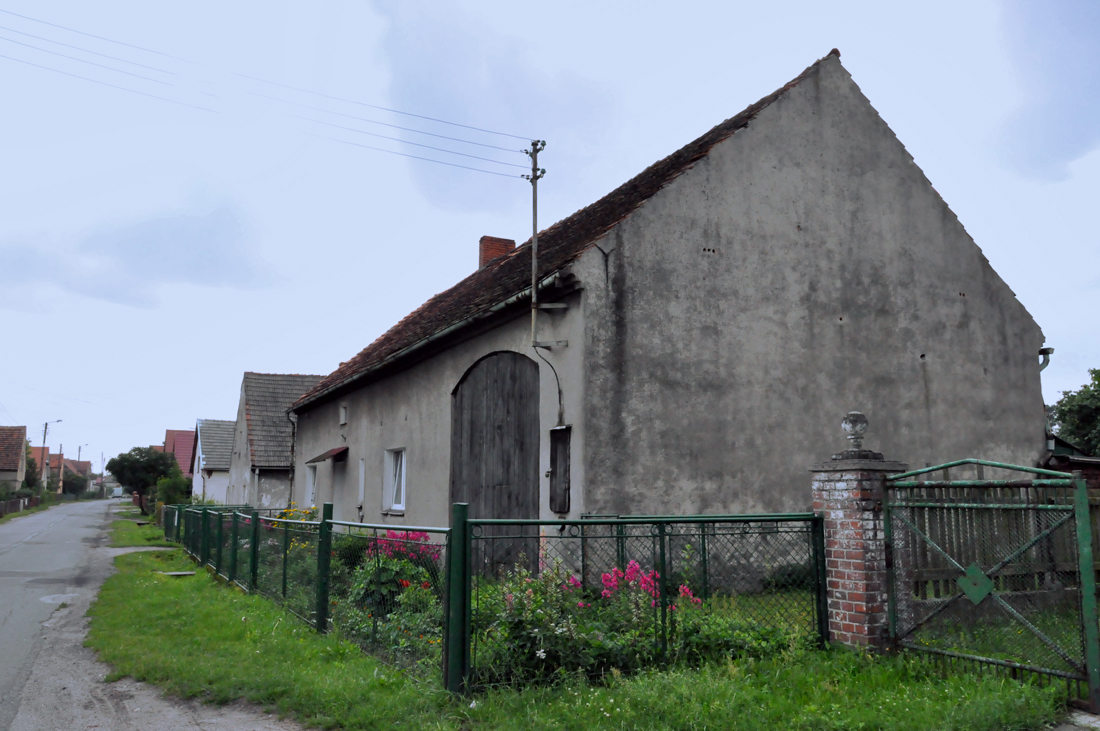

- Location within Poland
- Coordinates: 51°12′42″N 16°31′40″E
- Country: Poland
- Voivodeship: Lower Silesian
- County: Środa
- Gmina: Malczyce

Population
  - Total: 451
- Time zone: UTC+1 (CET)
  - Summer (DST): UTC+2 (CEST)
- Vehicle registration: DSR

Chomiąża [xɔˈmjɔ̃ʐa] is a village in the administrative district of Gmina Malczyce, within Środa County, Lower Silesian Voivodeship, in south-western Poland.

== History ==
The village was first part of Poland in the medieval period, then the Kingdom of Bohemia. It became part of the Habsburg monarchy in 1526, then part of Prussia after the Silesian Wars. It remained part of Prussia and later Germany until 1945, when it became again part of Poland. It was first recorded in 1175 as Chomesa, and has since carried the names Chomescha, Kumeise, Kumeyse, Komeise, Cameise, Cames, Camos, Kamos and finally its current name of Chomiaza.
