= Janiszów, Kraśnik County =

Janiszów
- Village
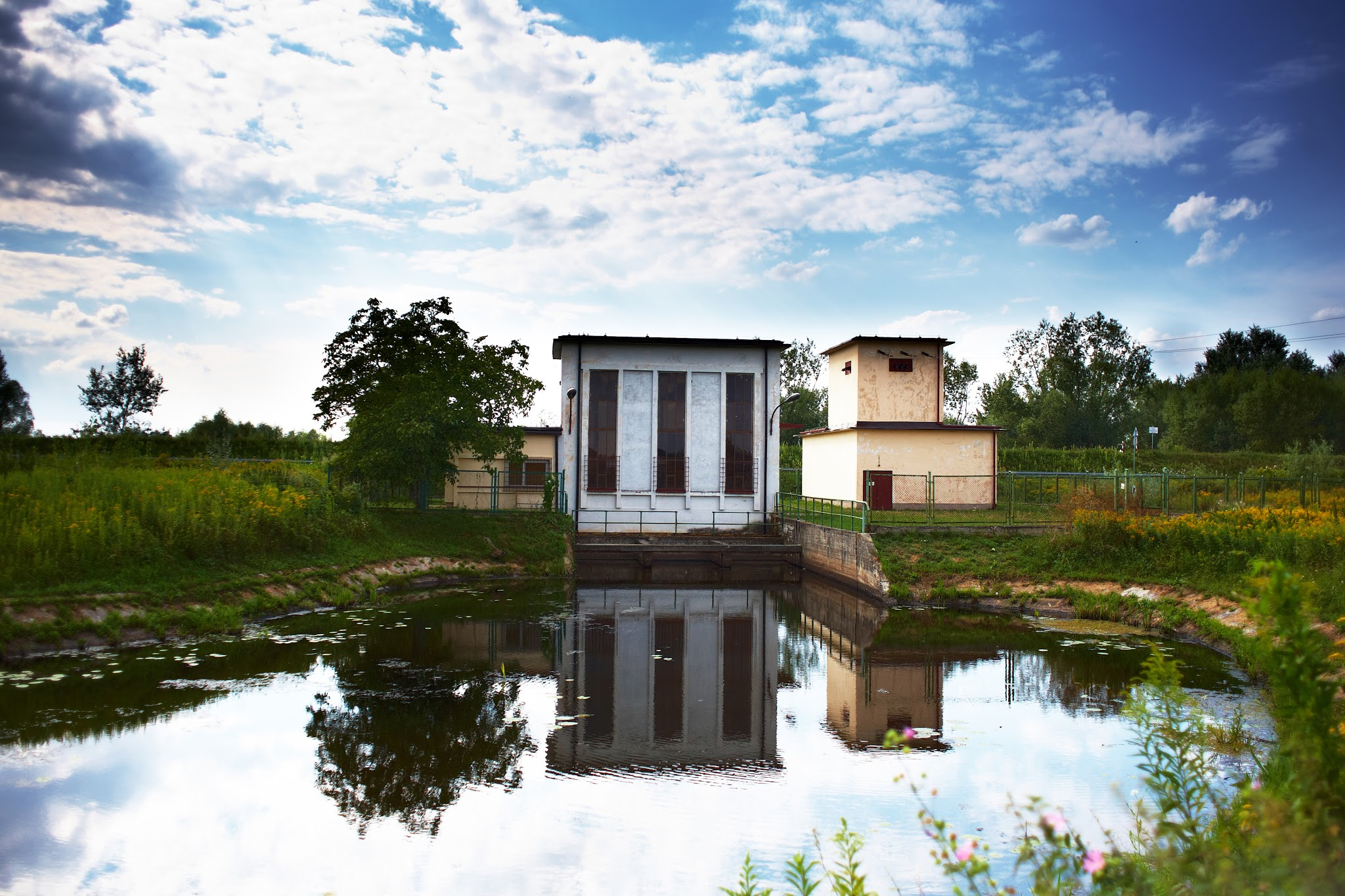

- Location within Poland
- Coordinates: 50°49′37″N 21°52′32″E
- Country: Poland
- Voivodeship: Lublin
- County: Kraśnik
- Gmina: Annopol

Population
  - Total: 610

Janiszów [jaˈɲiʂuf] is a village in the administrative district of Gmina Annopol, within Kraśnik County, Lublin Voivodeship, in eastern Poland.
