= Rachów, Lower Silesian Voivodeship =

Rachów
- Village
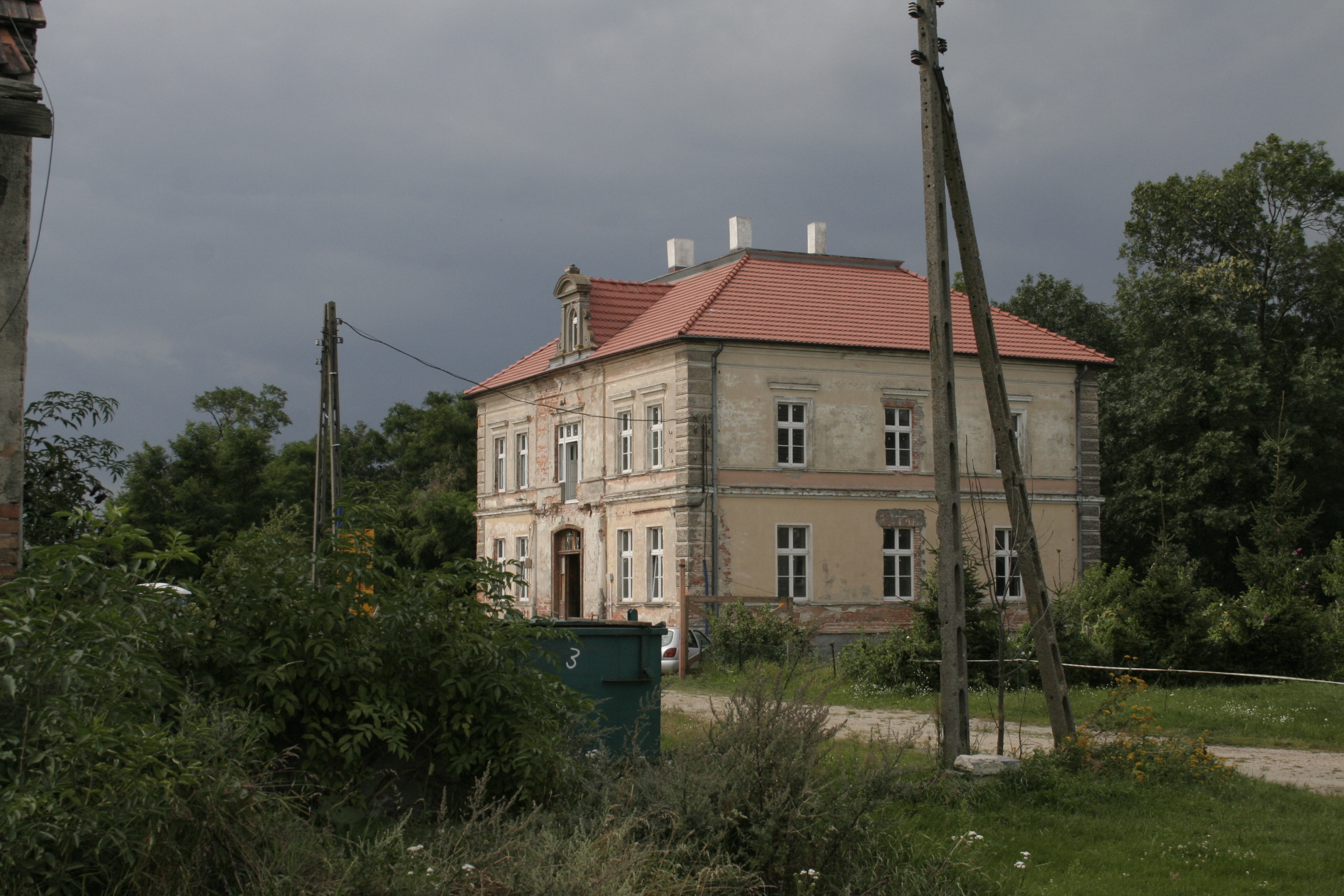
- Palace

- Location within Poland
- Coordinates: 51°12′N 16°30′E
- Country: Poland
- Voivodeship: Lower Silesian
- County: Środa
- Gmina: Malczyce

Rachów [ˈraxuf] is a village in the administrative district of Gmina Malczyce, within Środa County, Lower Silesian Voivodeship, in south-western Poland.
