= Grabówka, Kraśnik County =

Grabówka
- Village
- Location within Poland
- Coordinates: 50°56′25″N 21°56′51″E
- Country: Poland
- Voivodeship: Lublin
- County: Kraśnik
- Gmina: Annopol

Population
  - Total: 500

Grabówka [ɡraˈbufka] is a village in the administrative district of Gmina Annopol, within Kraśnik County, Lublin Voivodeship, in eastern Poland.
