= Gmina Podedwórze =

Gmina Podedwórze Podedwórze Commune
- Gmina
- Coat of arms

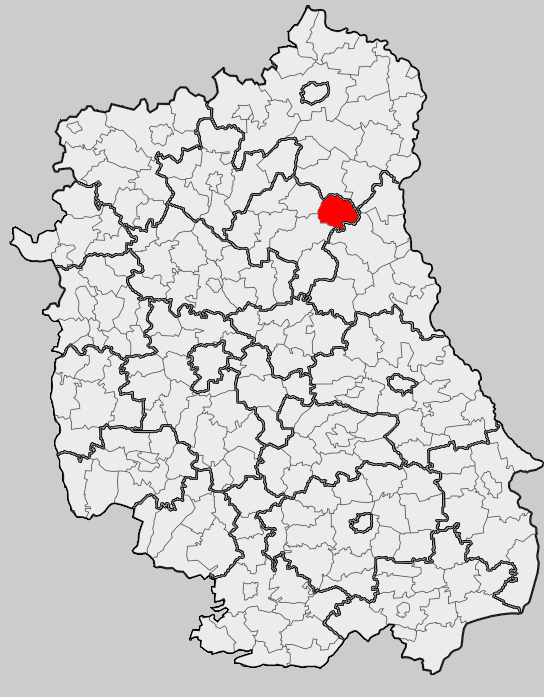
- Location within the county and voivodeship
- Coordinates (Podedwórze): 51°41′14″N 23°11′59″E
- Country: Poland
- Voivodeship: Lublin
- County: Parczew
- Seat: Podedwórze

Area
  - Total: 107.2 km^{2} (41.4 sq mi)

Population (2014)
  - Total: 1,706
  - Density: 15.91/km^{2} (41.22/sq mi)
- Website: http://www.gmina-podedworze.pl

Gmina Podedwórze is a rural gmina (administrative district) in Parczew County, Lublin Voivodeship, in eastern Poland. Its seat is the village of Podedwórze, which lies approximately 24 kilometres (15 mi) east of Parczew and 66 km (41 mi) north-east of the regional capital Lublin.

The gmina covers an area of 107.2 square kilometres (41.4 sq mi), and as of 2006 its total population is 1,848 (1,706 in 2014).

== Neighbouring gminas ==
Gmina Podedwórze is bordered by the gminas of Dębowa Kłoda, Jabłoń, Sosnówka, Wisznice and Wyryki.

== Villages ==
The gmina contains the following villages having the status of sołectwo: Antopol, Bojary, Grabówka, Hołowno, Kaniuki, Mosty, Niecielin, Opole, Podedwórze, Rusiły and Zaliszcze.
