= Annopol-Rachów =

- Village
- Location within Poland
- Coordinates: 50°53′13″N 21°51′38″E
- Country: Poland
- Voivodeship: Lublin
- County: Kraśnik
- Gmina: Annopol

Population
  - Total: 492

Annopol-Rachów (Polish pronunciation: ['anˈnɔpɔl ˈraxuf]) is a village in the administrative district of Gmina Annopol, within Kraśnik County, Lublin Voivodeship, in eastern Poland. It is located very short distance north of Annopol town, on the east bank of Vistula river.

The history of Annopol-Rachów, and Annopol, and are inextricably linked, often combining one with the other as one and the same in written records.
