= Studzianki =

Studzianki may refer to the following places:

- Studzianki, Piotrków County in Łódź Voivodeship (central Poland)
- Studzianki, Rawa County in Łódź Voivodeship (central Poland)
- Studzianki, Gmina Czerniewice, Tomaszów County in Łódź Voivodeship (central Poland)
- Studzianki, Lublin Voivodeship (east Poland)
- Studzianki, Masovian Voivodeship (east-central Poland)
- Studzianki Pancerne in Masovian Voivodeship (east-central Poland)
- Studzianki, Podlaskie Voivodeship (north-east Poland)
- Studzianki, Świętokrzyskie Voivodeship (south-central Poland)
- Battle of Studzianki

== See also ==
- Nowe Studzianki in Tomaszów County, Łódź Voivodeship (central Poland)
- Rębiszewo-Studzianki in Wysokie Mazowieckie County, Podlaskie Voivodeship (north-eastern Poland)
- Studzianki-Kolonia in Kraśnik County, Lublin Voivodeship (eastern Poland)
