= Lubiatów =

Lubiatów may refer to the following villages in Poland:

- Lubiatów, Gmina Miękinia in Środa County, Lower Silesian Voivodeship (south-west Poland)
- Lubiatów, Złotoryja County in Lower Silesian Voivodeship (south-west Poland)
- Lubiatów, Łódź Voivodeship (central Poland)
- Lubiatów, Krosno County in Lubusz Voivodeship (west Poland)
- Lubiatów, Strzelce-Drezdenko County in Lubusz Voivodeship (west Poland)
- Lubiatów, Wschowa County in Lubusz Voivodeship (west Poland)
- Lubiatów, Opole Voivodeship (south-west Poland)
