= Dębsko =

Dębsko may refer to the following places:

- Dębsko, Gmina Wielichowo, Grodzisk County in Greater Poland Voivodeship (west-central Poland)
- Dębsko, Kalisz County in Greater Poland Voivodeship (west-central Poland)
- Dębsko, Łódź Voivodeship (central Poland)
- Dębsko, West Pomeranian Voivodeship (north-west Poland)
