= Młynary (disambiguation) =

Młynary is a town in Warmian-Masurian Voivodeship (north Poland).

Młynary may also refer to:

- Młynary, Lower Silesian Voivodeship (south-west Poland)
- Młynary, Greater Poland Voivodeship (west-central Poland)
- Młynary, Łódź Voivodeship (central Poland)
- Młynary, West Pomeranian Voivodeship (north-west Poland)
