= Góry, Gmina Zakrzówek =

Góry
- Village
- Location within Poland
- Coordinates: 50°54′13″N 22°20′10″E
- Country: Poland
- Voivodeship: Lublin
- County: Kraśnik
- Gmina: Zakrzówek

Góry [ˈɡurɨ] is a village in the administrative district of Gmina Zakrzówek, within Kraśnik County, Lublin Voivodeship, in eastern Poland.
