= Polichno, Piotrków County =

Polichno
- Village
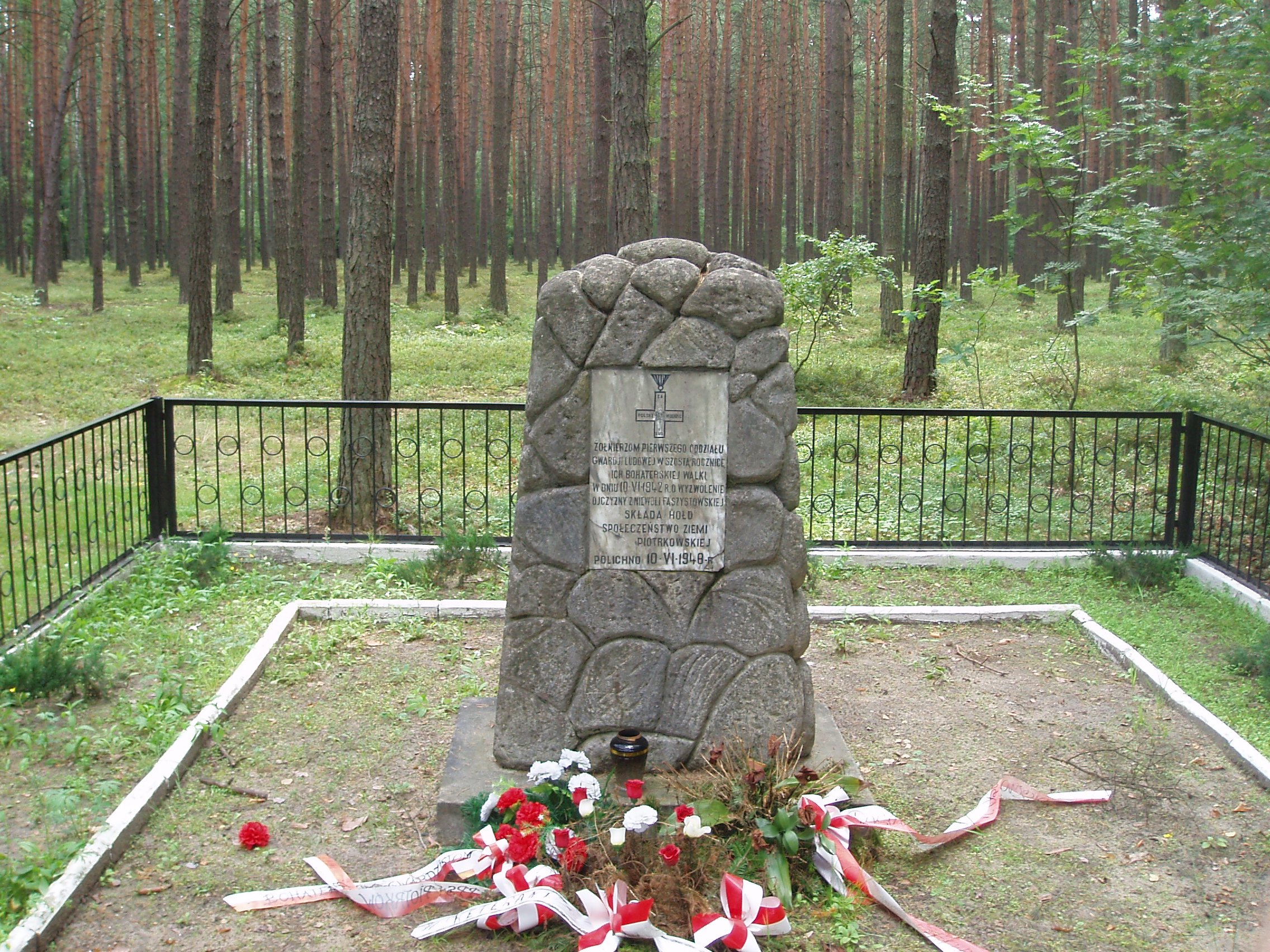

- Location within Poland
- Coordinates: 51°27′N 19°49′E
- Country: Poland
- Voivodeship: Łódź
- County: Piotrków
- Gmina: Wolbórz
- Population: 444

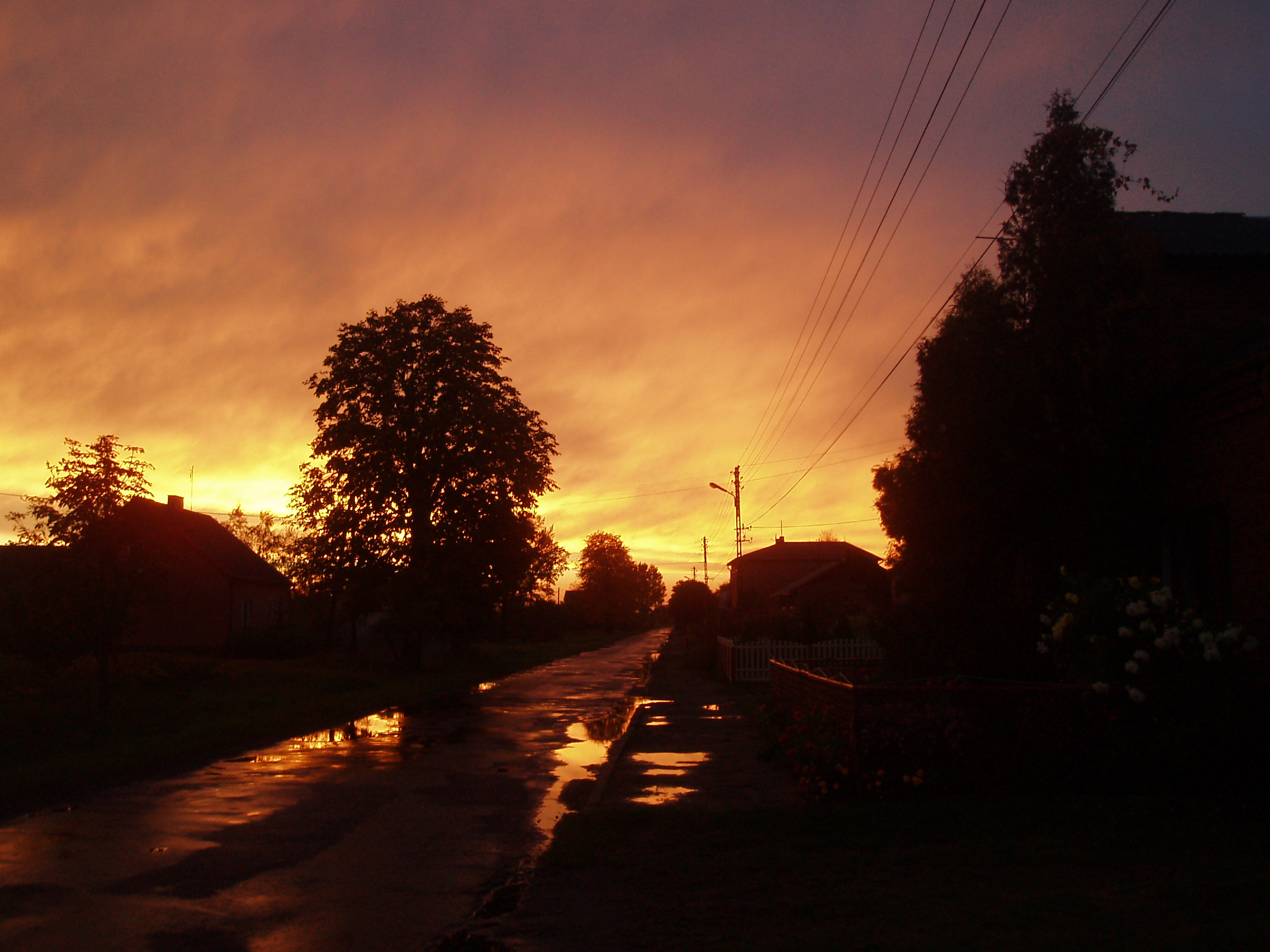
Main street of Polichno during sunset

Polichno [pɔˈlixnɔ] is a village in the administrative district of Gmina Wolbórz, within Piotrków County, Łódź Voivodeship, in central Poland.
