= Zakrzówek, Lublin Voivodeship =

Zakrzówek
- Village
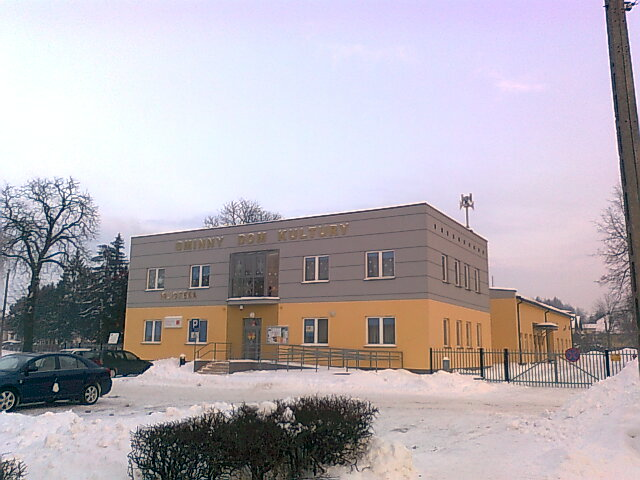
- Zakrzówek Community Centre (as of January 2013)

- Location within Poland
- Coordinates: 50°56′N 22°22′E
- Country: Poland
- Voivodeship: Lublin
- County: Kraśnik
- Gmina: Zakrzówek
- Website: http://www.zakrzowek.lubelskie.pl

Zakrzówek [zaˈkʂuvɛk] is a village in Kraśnik County, Lublin Voivodeship, in eastern Poland. It is the seat of the gmina (administrative district) called Gmina Zakrzówek.

== History ==
Zakrzówek was built before the 13th century. The village was a fief of the Cistercians. In the 16th century, a local church was built. In the 17th century, the parish of St. Nicholas was established. The wooden church, built in 1793, burned down in 1848. A new, brick church was built which still exists today.

=== The Holocaust ===
- More than 800 Jews lived in Zakrzówek upon the German invasion. In October 1942, 50 Jewish children together with elders and the disabled were slaughtered by the Nazis. A group of 400 remaining Jews—together with Jewish residents of nearby Annopol, Janów Lubelski and Dzierzkowice—were moved to the ghetto in neighboring Kraśnik. Some of them were taken to the labor camp at Budzyń by Kraśnik, but most of them were murdered in the death camps at Bełżec and Majdanek.

== Twin villages ==
- Malle, Belgium
