= Majdan-Grabina =

- Village
- Location within Poland
- Coordinates: 50°55′9″N 22°24′22″E
- Country: Poland
- Voivodeship: Lublin
- County: Kraśnik
- Gmina: Zakrzówek
- Time zone: UTC+1 (CET)
  - Summer (DST): UTC+2 (CEST)

Majdan-Grabina (Polish pronunciation: [ˈmajdaŋ ɡraˈbina]) is a village in the administrative district of Gmina Zakrzówek, within Kraśnik County, Lublin Voivodeship, in eastern Poland.

== History ==
Four Polish citizens were murdered by Nazi Germany in the village during World War II.
