= Psary-Lechawa =

- Village
- Location within Poland
- Coordinates: 51°29′06″N 19°46′27″E
- Country: Poland
- Voivodeship: Łódź
- County: Piotrków
- Gmina: Wolbórz

Psary-Lechawa [ˈpsarɨ lɛˈxava] is a village in the administrative district of Gmina Wolbórz, within Piotrków County, Łódź Voivodeship, in central Poland.
