= Bronisławów, Piotrków County =

Bronisławów
- Village
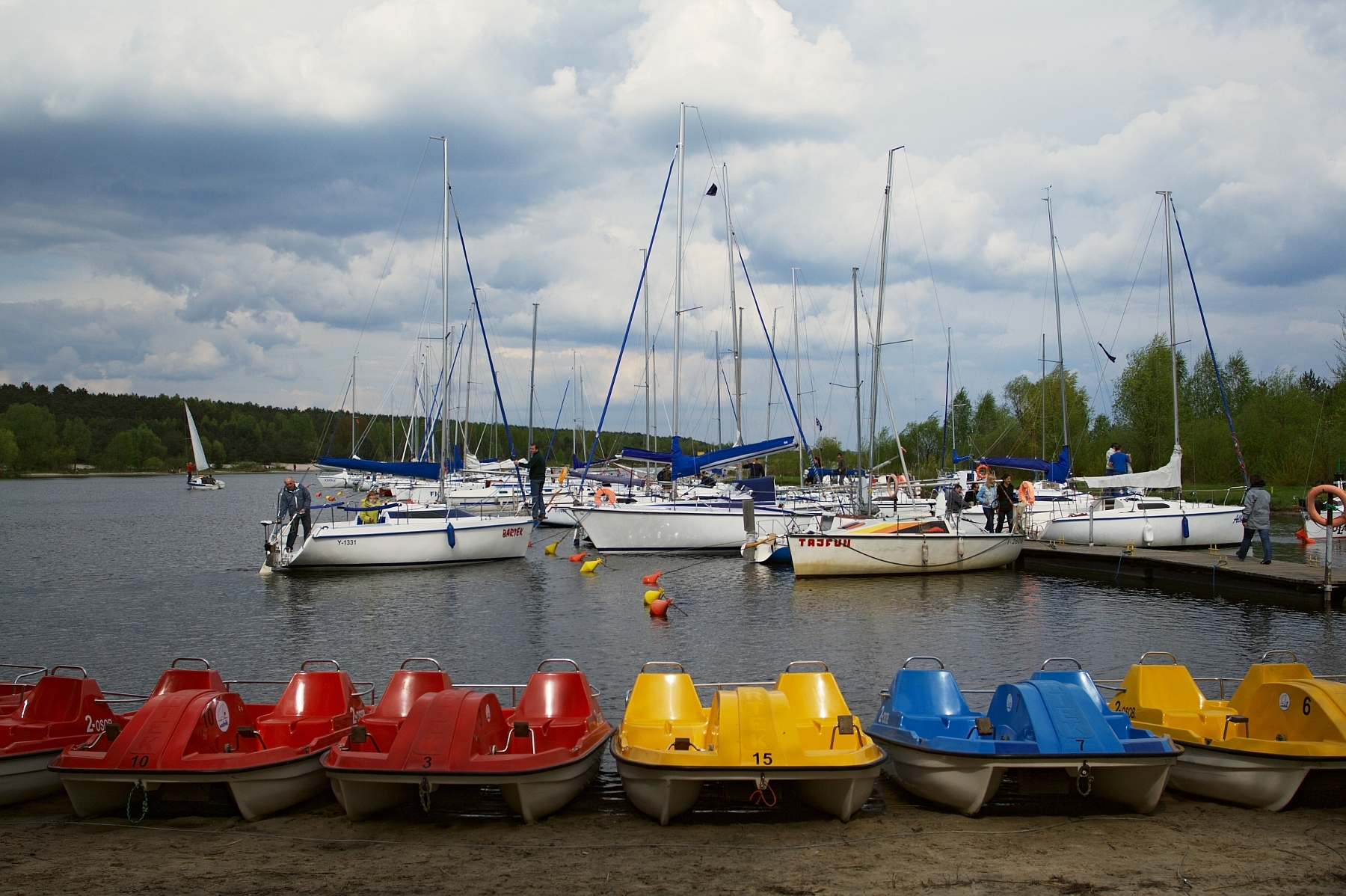

- Location within Poland
- Coordinates: 51°26′N 19°54′E
- Country: Poland
- Voivodeship: Łódź
- County: Piotrków
- Gmina: Wolbórz

Bronisławów [brɔniˈswavuf] is a village in the administrative district of Gmina Wolbórz, within Piotrków County, Łódź Voivodeship, in central Poland.
