= Lubiatów-Zakrzew =

Village in Gmina Wolbórz, Poland

- Village
- Location within Poland
- Coordinates: 51°32′40″N 19°45′43″E
- Country: Poland
- Voivodeship: Łódź
- County: Piotrków
- Gmina: Wolbórz

Lubiatów-Zakrzew [luˈbjatuf ˈzakʂɛf] is a village in the administrative district of Gmina Wolbórz, within Piotrków County, Łódź Voivodeship, in central Poland.
