= Rudnik Pierwszy =

- Village
- Location within Poland
- Coordinates: 50°57′44″N 22°26′15″E
- Country: Poland
- Voivodeship: Lublin
- County: Kraśnik
- Gmina: Zakrzówek

Rudnik Pierwszy (Polish pronunciation: [ˈrudɲik ˈpjɛrfʂɨ]) is a village in the administrative district of Gmina Zakrzówek, within Kraśnik County, Lublin Voivodeship, in eastern Poland.
