= Apolonka, Łódź Voivodeship =

Apolonka
- Village
- Location within Poland
- Coordinates: 51°28′19″N 19°53′53″E
- Country: Poland
- Voivodeship: Łódź
- County: Piotrków
- Gmina: Wolbórz
- Population: 40

Apolonka [apɔˈlɔŋka] is a village in the administrative district of Gmina Wolbórz, within Piotrków County, Łódź Voivodeship, in central Poland.
