= Psary Stare =

- Village
- Location within Poland
- Coordinates: 51°29′50″N 19°46′10″E
- Country: Poland
- Voivodeship: Łódź
- County: Piotrków
- Gmina: Wolbórz
- Population: 210

Psary Stare [ˈpsarɨ ˈstarɛ] is a village in the administrative district of Gmina Wolbórz, within Piotrków County, Łódź Voivodeship, in central Poland.
