= Zakrzówek-Rudy =

- Village
- Location within Poland
- Coordinates: 50°55′04″N 22°22′47″E
- Country: Poland
- Voivodeship: Lublin
- County: Kraśnik
- Gmina: Zakrzówek

Zakrzówek-Rudy [zaˈkʂuvɛk ˈrudɨ] is a village in the administrative district of Gmina Zakrzówek, within Kraśnik County, Lublin Voivodeship, in eastern Poland.
