= Świątniki, Piotrków County =

Świątniki
- Village
- Location within Poland
- Coordinates: 51°31′N 19°49′E
- Country: Poland
- Voivodeship: Łódź
- County: Piotrków
- Gmina: Wolbórz

Świątniki (Polish pronunciation: [ɕfjɔntˈɲikʲi]) is a village in the administrative district of Gmina Wolbórz, within Piotrków County, Łódź Voivodeship, in central Poland.
