= Gmina Wolbórz =

Gmina Wolbórz Wolbórz Commune
- Gmina
- Flag Coat of arms
- Interactive map of Gmina Wolbórz
- Coordinates (Wolbórz): 51°30′3″N 19°49′56″E
- Country: Poland
- Voivodeship: Łódź
- County: Piotrków County
- Seat: Wolbórz

Area
  - Total: 151.22 km^{2} (58.39 sq mi)

Population (2006)
  - Total: 7,646
  - Density: 50.56/km^{2} (131.0/sq mi)
- Website: https://wolborz.eu/

Gmina Wolbórz is an urban-rural gmina (administrative district) in Piotrków County, Łódź Voivodeship, in central Poland. Its seat is the town of Wolbórz, which lies approximately 16 kilometres (10 mi) north-east of Piotrków Trybunalski and 41 km (25 mi) south-east of the regional capital Łódź.

The gmina covers an area of 151.22 square kilometres (58.4 sq mi), and as of 2006 its total population is 7,646. It was formerly classed as a rural gmina, becoming urban-rural when Wolbórz was given town status on 1 January 2011.

The gmina contains part of the protected area called Sulejów Landscape Park.

== Villages ==
Apart from the town of Wolbórz, Gmina Wolbórz contains the villages and settlements of Adamów, Apolonka, Bogusławice, Bronisławów, Brudaki, Dębsko, Golesze Duże, Golesze Małe, Golesze-Parcela, Janów, Kaleń, Kolonia Dębina, Komorniki, Krzykowice, Kuznocin, Leonów, Lubiaszów, Lubiatów, Lubiatów-Zakrzew, Marianów, Młoszów, Młynary, Polichno, Proszenie, Psary Stare, Psary Witowskie, Psary-Lechawa, Stanisławów, Studzianki, Świątniki, Swolszewice Duże, Węgrzynów, Żarnowica Duża, Żarnowica Mała and Żywocin.

== Neighbouring gminas ==
Gmina Wolbórz is bordered by the city of Piotrków Trybunalski and by the gminas of Będków, Mniszków, Moszczenica, Sulejów, Tomaszów Mazowiecki and Ujazd.
