= Leonów, Piotrków County =

Leonów
- Village
- Location within Poland
- Coordinates: 51°27′N 19°55′E
- Country: Poland
- Voivodeship: Łódź
- County: Piotrków
- Gmina: Wolbórz

Leonów [lɛˈɔnuf] is a village in the administrative district of Gmina Wolbórz, within Piotrków County, Łódź Voivodeship, in central Poland.
