= Psary Witowskie =

- Village
- Location within Poland
- Coordinates: 51°29′48″N 19°46′53″E
- Country: Poland
- Voivodeship: Łódź
- County: Piotrków
- Gmina: Wolbórz

Psary Witowskie [ˈpsarɨ viˈtɔfskʲɛ] is a village in the administrative district of Gmina Wolbórz, within Piotrków County, Łódź Voivodeship, in central Poland.
