= Golesze Małe =

Village in Gmina Wolbórz, Poland

- Village
- Location within Poland
- Coordinates: 51°26′18″N 19°53′6″E
- Country: Poland
- Voivodeship: Łódź
- County: Piotrków
- Gmina: Wolbórz

Golesze Małe [ɡɔˈlɛʂɛ ˈmawɛ] is a village in the administrative district of Gmina Wolbórz, within Piotrków County, Łódź Voivodeship, in central Poland.
