= Bystrzyca, Kraśnik County =

Bystrzyca
- Village
- Location within Poland
- Coordinates: 50°58′20″N 22°23′47″E
- Country: Poland
- Voivodeship: Lublin
- County: Kraśnik
- Gmina: Zakrzówek

Bystrzyca [bɨsˈtʂɨt͡sa] is a village in the administrative district of Gmina Zakrzówek, within Kraśnik County, Lublin Voivodeship, in eastern Poland.
