= Józefin, Gmina Zakrzówek =

Józefin
- Village
- Location within Poland
- Coordinates: 50°55′47″N 22°26′56″E
- Country: Poland
- Voivodeship: Lublin
- County: Kraśnik
- Gmina: Zakrzówek

Józefin [juˈzɛfin] is a village in the administrative district of Gmina Zakrzówek, within Kraśnik County, Lublin Voivodeship, in eastern Poland.
