= Gmina Zakrzówek =

Administrative district in Poland

Gmina Zakrzówek Zakrzówek Commune
- Gmina
- Flag Coat of arms
- Interactive map of Gmina Zakrzówek
- Coordinates (Zakrzówek): 50°56′N 22°22′E
- Country: Poland
- Voivodeship: Lublin
- County: Kraśnik
- Seat: Zakrzówek

Area
  - Total: 99.08 km^{2} (38.26 sq mi)

Population (2013)
  - Total: 6,823
  - Density: 68.86/km^{2} (178.4/sq mi)
- Website: http://www.zakrzowek.pl/

Gmina Zakrzówek is a rural gmina (administrative district) in Kraśnik County, Lublin Voivodeship, in eastern Poland. Its seat is the village of Zakrzówek, which lies approximately 11 kilometres (7 mi) east of Kraśnik and 38 km (24 mi) south of the regional capital Lublin.

The gmina covers an area of 99.08 square kilometres (38.3 sq mi), and as of 2006 its total population is 6,935 (6,823 in 2013).

== Villages ==
Gmina Zakrzówek contains the villages and settlements of Bystrzyca, Góry, Józefin, Kopaniny, Lipno, Majdan-Grabina, Majorat, Rudnik Drugi, Rudnik Pierwszy, Studzianki, Studzianki-Kolonia, Sulów, Świerczyna, Tartak, Zakrzówek, Zakrzówek Nowy, Zakrzówek-Rudy and Zakrzówek-Wieś.

== Neighbouring gminas ==
Gmina Zakrzówek is bordered by the gminas of Batorz, Bychawa, Kraśnik, Strzyżewice, Szastarka, Wilkołaz and Zakrzew.
