= Tartak, Lublin Voivodeship =

Tartak
- Village
- Location within Poland
- Coordinates: 50°54′50″N 22°26′55″E
- Country: Poland
- Voivodeship: Lublin
- County: Kraśnik
- Gmina: Zakrzówek

Tartak [ˈtartak] is a village in the administrative district of Gmina Zakrzówek, within Kraśnik County, Lublin Voivodeship, in eastern Poland.
