= Majorat, Lublin Voivodeship =

Majorat
- Village
- Location within Poland
- Coordinates: 50°57′42″N 22°23′12″E
- Country: Poland
- Voivodeship: Lublin
- County: Kraśnik
- Gmina: Zakrzówek

Majorat [maˈjɔrat] is a village in the administrative district of Gmina Zakrzówek, within Kraśnik County, Lublin Voivodeship, in eastern Poland.
