= Andrzej Frycz Modrzewski =

Polish renaissance scholar (1503–1572)

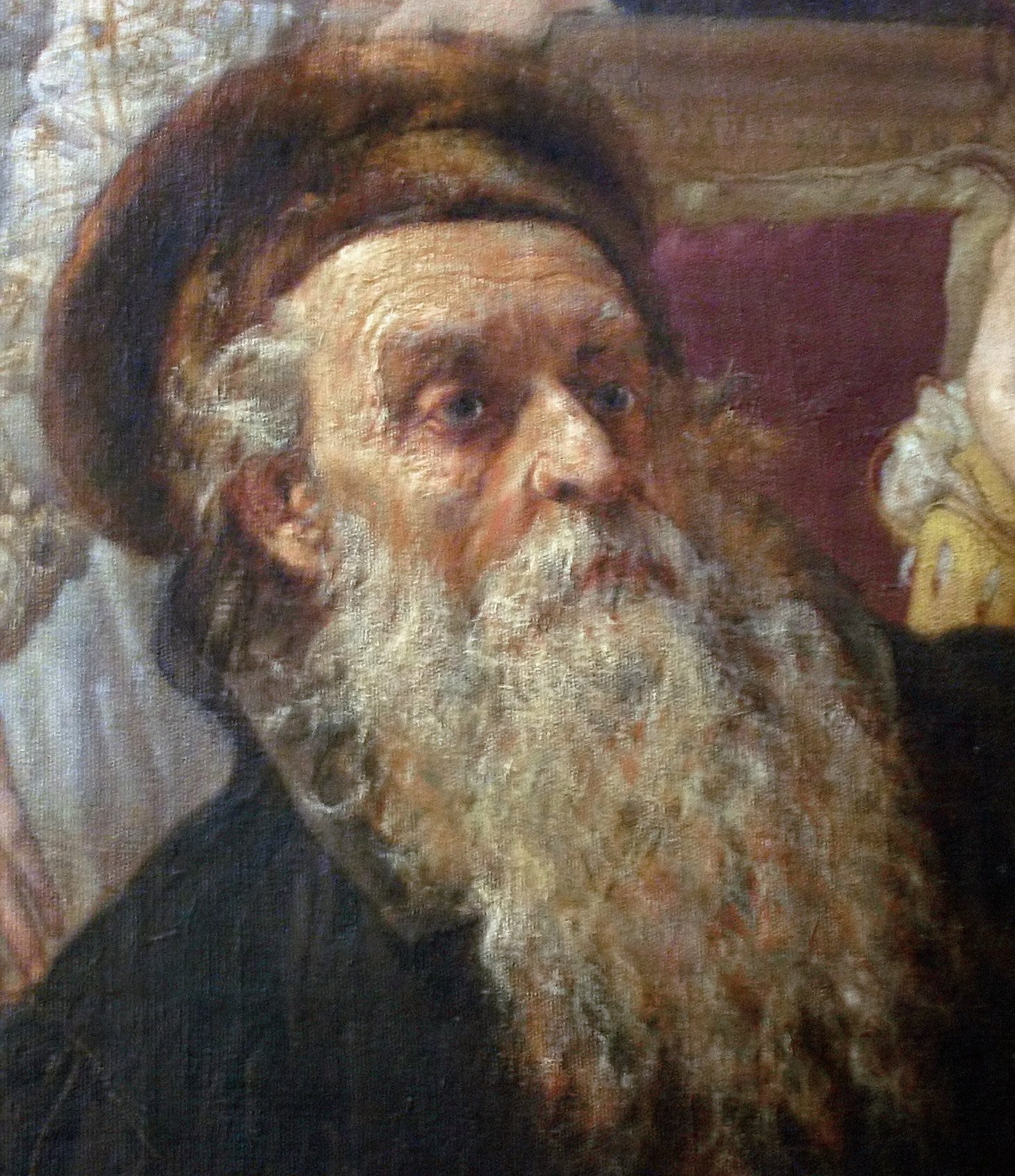
- Andrzej Frycz Modrzewski, as depicted in a painting by Jan Matejko, depicting the Union of Lublin.
- Born: 20 September 1503; Wolbórz
- Died: 1572 (aged 68–69); Wolbórz
- Other name: Modrevius
- Father: Jakub Modrzewski

Philosophical work
- Era: Renaissance philosophy
- Region: Western philosophy Polish philosophy
- Main interests: Politics, theology
- Notable works: Commentaries on the Improvement of the Commonwealth (1551)
- Notable ideas: Equality before the law

Andrzej Frycz Modrzewski (20 September 1503 – 1572), known in Latin as Andreas Fricius Modrevius, was a Polish Renaissance scholar, humanist and theologian, called "the father of Polish democracy". His book De Republica emendanda (O poprawie Rzeczypospolitej) was widely read and praised across most of Renaissance Europe, influencing thinkers such as Jean Bodin, Hugo Grotius and Johannes Althusius.

== Life ==
Modrzewski was born in Wolbórz (also known as Woybor, Voibor, Woibor, Wojbor, Woyborz and Wolborz), near Piotrków Trybunalski, the son of Jakub Modrzewski (1477–1529). Modrzewski family belonged to the gentry (though some authors speak of impoverished nobility), bore Jastrzębiec coat of arms, and held the hereditary title of mayor (wójt/vogt/advocatus) of Wolbórz. After graduating from the Kraków Academy, he was ordained a vicar and served under Archbishop Jan Łaski (the Elder), and later under the Bishop of Poznań, Jan Latalski. From 1530 he was connected to the court of Jan Łaski the Younger, the Primate of Poland and nephew of the elder Łaski. Having lived for a time in Germany, where he studied at the Lutheran University he met Martin Luther and other early Protestant reformers in Wittenberg. He also took care of the library of Erasmus bought by Łaski.

From 1540 onwards, he served as the titular parish priest in Brzeziny and Skoszewy. In 1541, during his stay in the capital, he met with Mikołaj Rej. Modrzewski advocated sending a mixed ecclesiastical and secular delegation to the 1545 Ecumenical Council of Trent (where he would be sent as a Polish delegate). He supported Irenicism (the importance of unity) and the democratic and ecumenical element in the Church. He became an official at the court of Sigismund II Augustus in 1547. Since he was leaning strongly towards the reformist circles (especially Calvinian and Arian/Polish brethren), he became in danger of being accused of heresy and was ultimately stripped of his ecclesiastical titles and offices. The king, however, issued a letter of protection for him. In 1553 he retired to his native Wolbórz.

Modrzewski debuted as a writer in 1543 with the work called Lascius, sive de poena homicidii (On The Penalty for Manslaughter; or Łaski, czyli O karze za mężobójstwo in Polish). In it, Modrzewski criticized the inequality prescribed by the law for different social classes: for example, while the penalty for killing a nobleman ranged from 120 grzywna – through life imprisonment – to death, the penalty for killing a peasant was only 10 grzywna. Yet it was On the Improvement of the Commonwealth (De Republica emendanda) that brought him eternal and international fame. In it, he advocated a strong monarchy that would protect the rights of all citizens. He postulated equality of all before the law, and criticized the 1565 ban on land-owning by non-nobles. He wrote that peasants should own the soil which they work, and that townsfolk should be able to buy land and be elected to offices (those rights were being reserved only for the nobility back then), demanded the reform (secularization) of education, and division between state and church. This treatise was translated into many European languages and earned him many enemies in the Church. Pope Paul V placed the book on the Index Librorum Prohibitorum (list of prohibited books).

== De Republica emendanda ==
Modrzewski's crowning achievement printed in 1551 was: Commentariorum De Republica emendanda libri quinque (Five Books of Commentaries on the Improvement of Commonwealth, or Rozważań o poprawie Rzeczypospolitej ksiąg pięć in Polish) published in the printing house of Łazarz Andrysowic. Originally it was to include all five manuscripts: 1. De Moribus (On Customs); 2. De Legibus (On Laws); 3. De Bello (On War); 4. De Ecclesia (On Church), and 5. De Schola (On School). However, as some of Modrevius' theses were considered unorthodox by the Church and opposed, only the three first books were included in the original publication.

The first complete edition – consisting of all five beforementioned books, and dialogues entitled: De utraque specie Coenae Domini ('On the twofold nature of the Lord's Table') – was published in 1554 in Basel by Johannes Oporinus, after which Modrzewski was forced to leave the capital. The first Polish translation by Cyprian Bazylik was published in Łosk in 1577. The book was widely read and praised across Renaissance Europe. It was translated into German, French, Spanish, and Russian in the 17th century.

=== Other works ===
- 1543: Lascius sive de poena homicidii (On The Penalty For Manslaughter, Polish title: Łaski albo o karze za mężobójstwo)
- 1545: Oratio Philatelis Peripatetici in senatulo hominum scholasticorum de decreto conventus, quo pagi civibus adimi permittuntur, habita... (The Discourse Of A Truthful Peripatethic spoken among the learned men about the parliamentary decree, which allows country estates to be taken away from townfolk, Polish title Mowa Prawdomówcy Perypatetyka o postanowieniu sejmu zezwalającym na odbieranie mieszczanom wiejskich posiadłości, wypowiedziana w kole ludzi uczonych)
- 1561: Narratio simplex rei novae et eiusdem pessimi exempli... (Simple story considering the curious case and the bad example which it is..., Polish title Prosta opowieść o niezwykłej sprawie stanowiącej zgubny przykład, a zarazem użalenie się na krzywdy i skarga przeciw Stanisławowi Orzechowskiemu z Rusi)
- 1590: Silvae, including Modrevius' four theological discourses (De tribus personis et una essentia Dei, On the three Persons and one essence of God; De necessitate conventus habendi ad sedandas religionis controversias, On the necessity of gathering to cease the religious controversies; De Iesu Christo On Jesus Christ; De Homousio On Homousia")

== Lineage ==
Descendants of Modrzewski's daughter, include Victor Modrzewski, Polish President Lech Kaczyński and Princess Mathilde, Duchess of Brabant.

== Quotes ==
- "Without laws there can be no true freedom." (Bez praw nie może być prawdziwej wolności.)
- "The peasant is not your slave, he is your neighbor."

== See also ==
- Polish literature
- Piotr Skarga
- Szymon Starowolski
- History of philosophy in Poland
- List of Poles
