= Janów, Gmina Wolbórz =

Janów
- Village
- Location within Poland
- Coordinates: 51°28′46″N 19°53′57″E
- Country: Poland
- Voivodeship: Łódź
- County: Piotrków
- Gmina: Wolbórz
- Population: 40

Janów [ˈjanuf] is a village in the administrative district of Gmina Wolbórz, within Piotrków County, Łódź Voivodeship, in central Poland.
