= Kopaniny, Lublin Voivodeship =

Kopaniny
- Village
- Location within Poland
- Coordinates: 50°54′00″N 22°20′32″E
- Country: Poland
- Voivodeship: Lublin
- County: Kraśnik
- Gmina: Zakrzówek

Kopaniny [kɔpaˈninɨ] is a village in the administrative district of Gmina Zakrzówek, within Kraśnik County, Lublin Voivodeship, in eastern Poland.
