= Wolbórz =

- Town
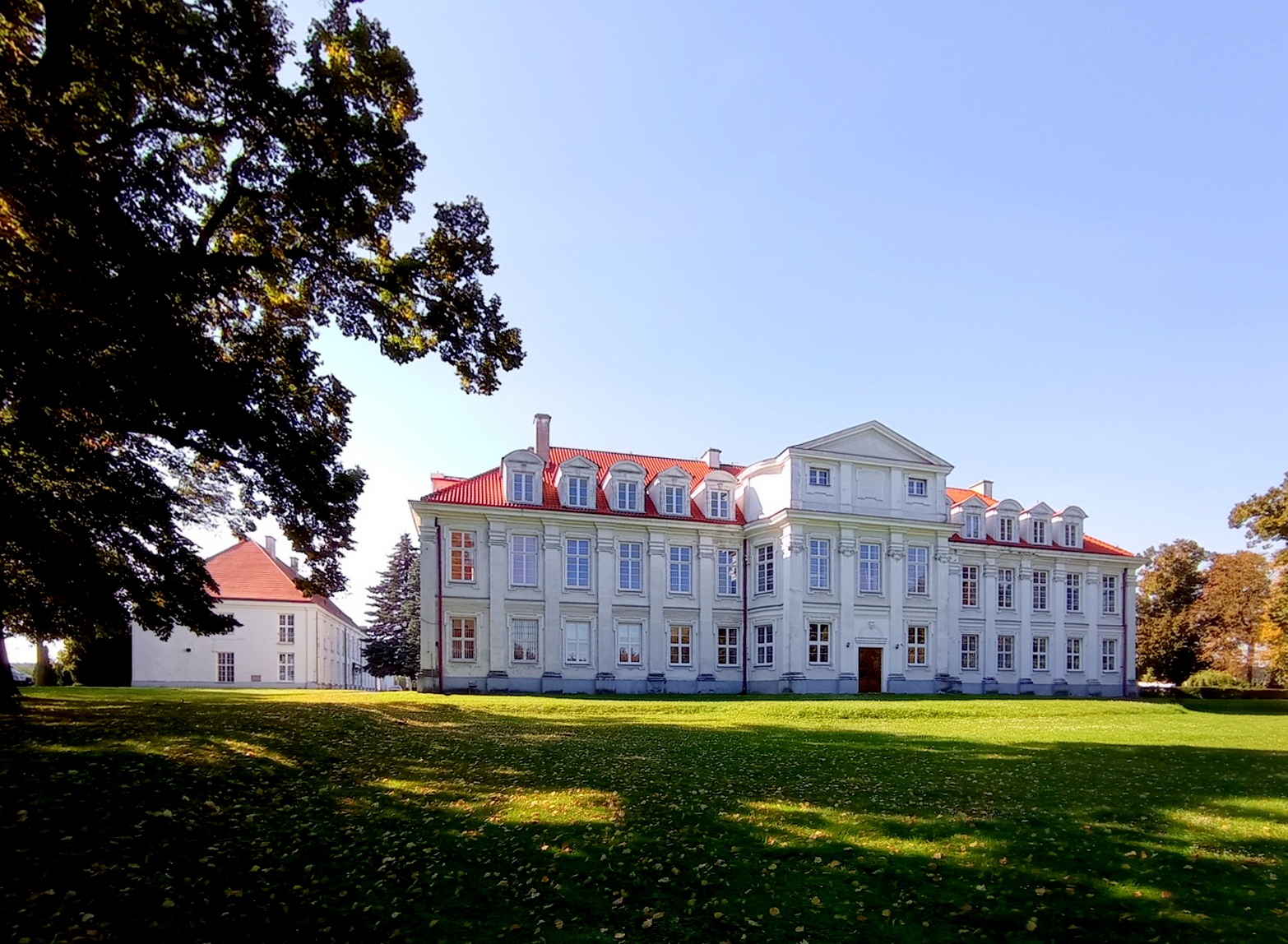
- Bishops Palace

- Flag Coat of arms

- Location within Poland
- Coordinates: 51°30′3″N 19°49′56″E
- Country: Poland
- Voivodeship: Łódź
- County: Piotrków
- Gmina: Wolbórz
- Town rights: 1273

Population (31 December 2020)
  - Total: 2,301 ▼
- Time zone: UTC+1 (CET)
  - Summer (DST): UTC+2 (CEST)
- Vehicle registration: EPI
- Website: http://www.wolborz.eu/

Wolbórz [ˈvɔlbuʂ] is a town in Piotrków County, Łódź Voivodeship, in central Poland. It is the seat of the administrative district (gmina) called Gmina Wolbórz. It lies approximately 16 km (10 mi) north-east of Piotrków Trybunalski and 41 km (25 mi) south-east of the regional capital Łódź. It is located in the Sieradz Land. It is located on the Route of the Heroes of the Battle of Warsaw 1920, the main highway connecting Wrocław and Łódź with Warsaw and Białystok.

Wolbórz is a former medieval market town that became a regional center for clothmaking and brewing since the 15th century. The local landmark is the Baroque palace and park ensemble.

Wolbórz has a population of 2,301, as of 2020.

== History ==
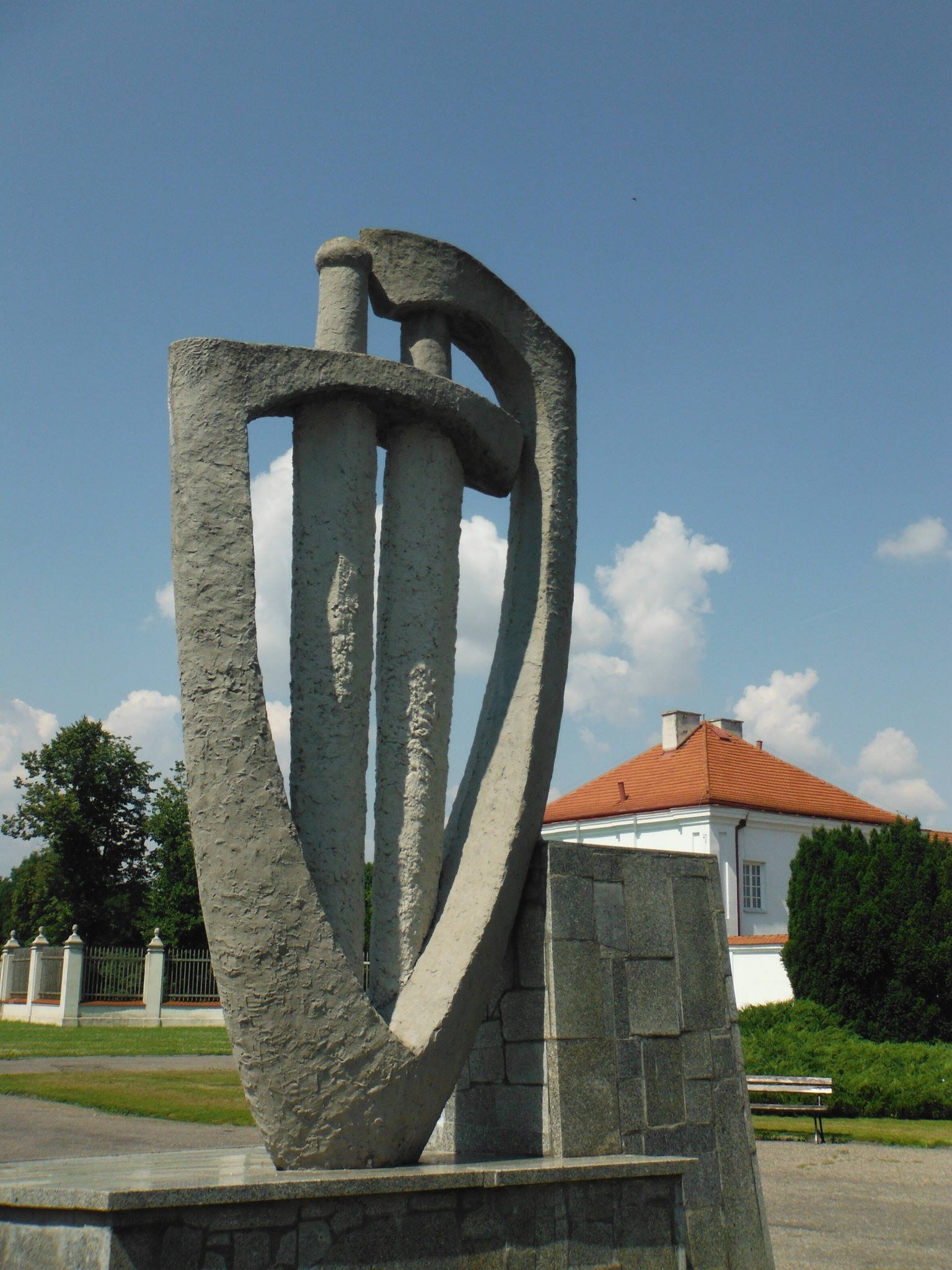
Monument commemorating the departure of Polish troops from Wolbórz for the Battle of Grunwald in 1410

According to archaeologists, first human settlements appeared in today Wolbórz in c. 4000 BC. In early times of the Kingdom of Poland, Wolbórz emerged as a center of local administrative unit called opole, which was later turned into a castellany. In the 1120s, Wolbórz became one of seats of Bishops of Kuyavia. By that time, it already was an important trade center, which was confirmed in 1273, when Wolbórz was granted a town charter by Duke Leszek II the Black.

In 1357, the charter of Wolbórz was modeled after more modern Magdeburg rights, and the town was so important, that it had a branch of the Cracow Academy, with a rector, six professors and permission to grant academic titles. On September 9, 1409, King Władysław II Jagiełło issued here an appeal to Polish clergy and nobility, urging them to fight the Teutonic Knights. Also, knights from Lesser Poland, Podolia and Red Ruthenia concentrated here before the Battle of Grunwald. King Jagiello visited Wolbórz as many as 15 times, other Polish rulers also came to the town, especially when Crown Tribunal was held in nearby Piotrków Trybunalski.

In the 15th and 16th centuries Wolbórz prospered. The town was a large trade and artisan center, with a number of workshops, breweries and mills. In 1521, Wolbórz had a population of 3,000, with five churches, three synagogues, three hospitals, 400 houses, a town hall, bishop’s castle with Italian garden, and 259 artisans. In 1536 and 1548, the town was burned in fires. In 1544, St. Nicholas church was turned into a collegiate, and in 1553, Andrzej Frycz Modrzewski was named the local wójt (Modrzewski was born here in 1503). It was a private church town, administratively located in the Piotrków County in the Sieradz Voivodeship in the Greater Poland Province of the Kingdom of Poland.

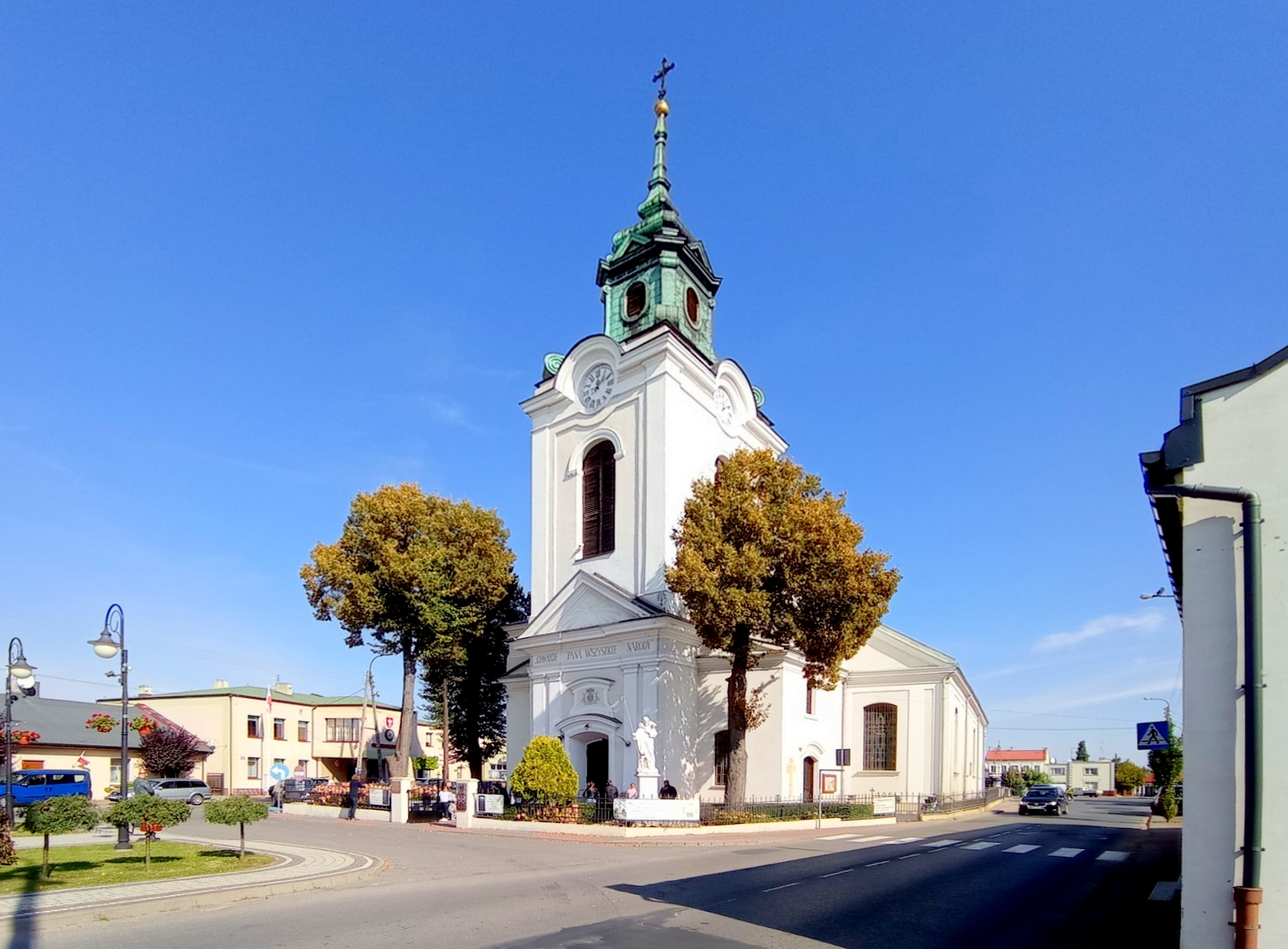
Baroque Saint Nicholas collegiate church

The period of prosperity ended in the 17th century. In 1618, Wolbórz burned in a fire; in 1655, the town was ransacked by Swedish soldiers; and in 1671, the town burned again. After these calamities, Wolbórz never recovered.

Following the Partitions of Poland and the Congress of Vienna, Wolbórz since 1815 belonged to Russian-controlled Congress Poland. In 1870, following the January Uprising, it lost its town charter. In 1892, its population was 3,000, including 700 Jews.

Following the joint German-Soviet invasion of Poland, which started World War II in September 1939, the town was occupied by Germany until 1945.

It regained its town rights on 1 January 2011.

== Sights ==
Among main sights are the Baroque palace and park ensemble, former residence of Bishops of Kuyavia, the Baroque St. Nicholas collegiate church, 19th-century synagogue, and 19th-century tenement houses.

== Notable people ==
- Andrzej Frycz Modrzewski (1503–1572), Polish Renaissance scholar, humanist and theologian
