= Zakrzówek Nowy =

- Village
- Location within Poland
- Coordinates: 50°57′N 22°25′E
- Country: Poland
- Voivodeship: Lublin
- County: Kraśnik
- Gmina: Zakrzówek
- Population: 130

Zakrzówek Nowy [zaˈkʂuvɛk ˈnɔvɨ] is a village in the administrative district of Gmina Zakrzówek, within Kraśnik County, Lublin Voivodeship, in eastern Poland.
