= Kolonia Dębina =

- Settlement
- Location within Poland
- Coordinates: 51°29′23″N 19°52′28″E
- Country: Poland
- Voivodeship: Łódź
- County: Piotrków
- Gmina: Wolbórz
- Population: 10

Kolonia Dębina [kɔˈlɔɲa dɛmˈbina] is a settlement in the administrative district of Gmina Wolbórz, within Piotrków County, Łódź Voivodeship, in central Poland.
