= Stanisławów, Gmina Wolbórz =

Stanisławów
- Village
- Location within Poland
- Coordinates: 51°29′30″N 19°53′32″E
- Country: Poland
- Voivodeship: Łódź
- County: Piotrków
- Gmina: Wolbórz
- Population: 112

Stanisławów [staniˈswavuf] is a village in the administrative district of Gmina Wolbórz, within Piotrków County, Łódź Voivodeship, in central Poland.
