= Kaleń, Piotrków County =

Kaleń
- Village
- Location within Poland
- Coordinates: 51°29′N 19°53′E
- Country: Poland
- Voivodeship: Łódź
- County: Piotrków
- Gmina: Wolbórz

Kaleń [ˈkalɛɲ] is a village in the administrative district of Gmina Wolbórz, within Piotrków County, Łódź Voivodeship, in central Poland.
