= Żarnowica Mała =

- Village
- Location within Poland
- Coordinates: 51°28′29″N 19°50′34″E
- Country: Poland
- Voivodeship: Łódź
- County: Piotrków
- Gmina: Wolbórz
- Population: 60

Żarnowica Mała [ʐarnɔˈvit͡sa ˈmawa] is a village in the administrative district of Gmina Wolbórz, within Piotrków County, Łódź Voivodeship, in central Poland.
