= Proszenie =

- Village
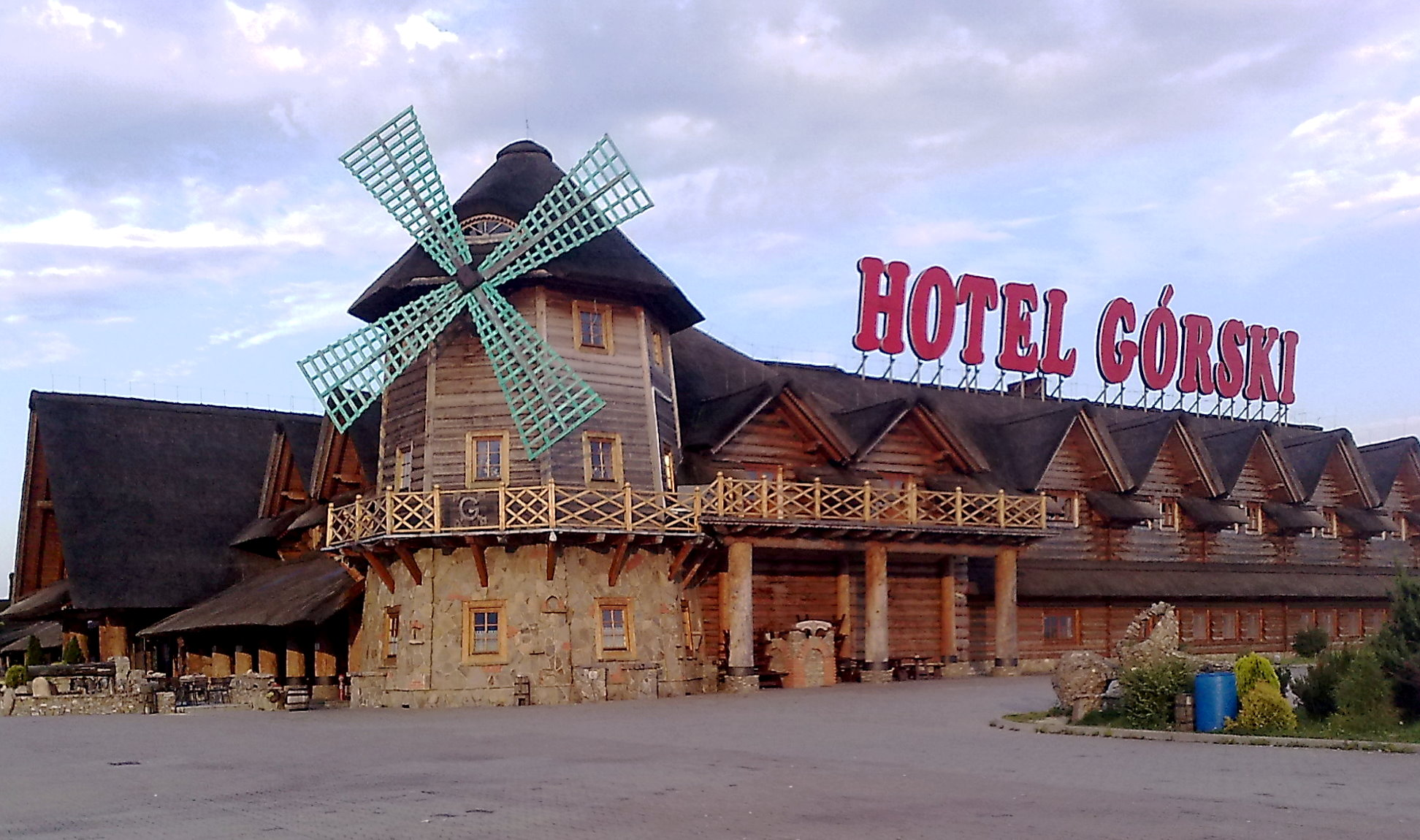

- Location within Poland
- Coordinates: 51°29′N 19°47′E
- Country: Poland
- Voivodeship: Łódź
- County: Piotrków
- Gmina: Wolbórz
- Population (approx.): 500

Proszenie [prɔˈʂɛɲɛ] is a village in the administrative district of Gmina Wolbórz, within Piotrków County, Łódź Voivodeship, in central Poland.

The village has an approximate population of 500.
