= Żywocin =

- Village
- Location within Poland
- Coordinates: 51°33′N 19°51′E
- Country: Poland
- Voivodeship: Łódź
- County: Piotrków
- Gmina: Wolbórz

Żywocin [ʐɨˈvɔt͡ɕin] is a village in the administrative district of Gmina Wolbórz, within Piotrków County, Łódź Voivodeship, in central Poland.
