= Świerczyna, Lublin Voivodeship =

Świerczyna
- Village
- Location within Poland
- Coordinates: 50°56′N 22°26′E
- Country: Poland
- Voivodeship: Lublin
- County: Kraśnik
- Gmina: Zakrzówek

Świerczyna (Polish pronunciation: [ɕfjɛrˈt͡ʂɨna]) is a village in the administrative district of Gmina Zakrzówek, within Kraśnik County, Lublin Voivodeship, in eastern Poland.
