= Węgrzynów, Łódź Voivodeship =

Węgrzynów
- Village
- Location within Poland
- Coordinates: 51°29′16″N 19°54′1″E
- Country: Poland
- Voivodeship: Łódź
- County: Piotrków
- Gmina: Wolbórz
- Population: 10

Węgrzynów [vɛŋˈɡʐɨnuf] is a village in the administrative district of Gmina Wolbórz, within Piotrków County, Łódź Voivodeship, in central Poland.
