= Studzianki-Kolonia =

- Village
- Location within Poland
- Coordinates: 50°53′N 22°27′E
- Country: Poland
- Voivodeship: Lublin
- County: Kraśnik
- Gmina: Zakrzówek

Studzianki-Kolonia [stuˈd͡ʑaŋki kɔˈlɔɲa] is a village in the administrative district of Gmina Zakrzówek, within Kraśnik County, Lublin Voivodeship, in eastern Poland.

== See also ==
- Kolonia
- Studzianki
