= Marianów, Gmina Wolbórz =

Marianów
- Village
- Location within Poland
- Coordinates: 51°28′5″N 19°54′2″E
- Country: Poland
- Voivodeship: Łódź
- County: Piotrków
- Gmina: Wolbórz

Marianów [maˈrjanuf] is a village in the administrative district of Gmina Wolbórz, within Piotrków County, Łódź Voivodeship, in central Poland.
