= Żarnowica Duża =

- Village
- Location within Poland
- Coordinates: 51°27′55″N 19°50′44″E
- Country: Poland
- Voivodeship: Łódź
- County: Piotrków
- Gmina: Wolbórz
- Population: 400

Żarnowica Duża [ʐarnɔˈvit͡sa ˈduʐa] is a village in the administrative district of Gmina Wolbórz, within Piotrków County, Łódź Voivodeship, in central Poland.
