= Rudnik Drugi =

- Village
- Location within Poland
- Coordinates: 50°56′39″N 22°27′30″E
- Country: Poland
- Voivodeship: Lublin
- County: Kraśnik
- Gmina: Zakrzówek
- Population: 440

Rudnik Drugi (Polish pronunciation: [ˈrudɲik ˈdruɡʲi]) is a village in the administrative district of Gmina Zakrzówek, within Kraśnik County, Lublin Voivodeship, in eastern Poland.
