= Swolszewice Duże =

- Village
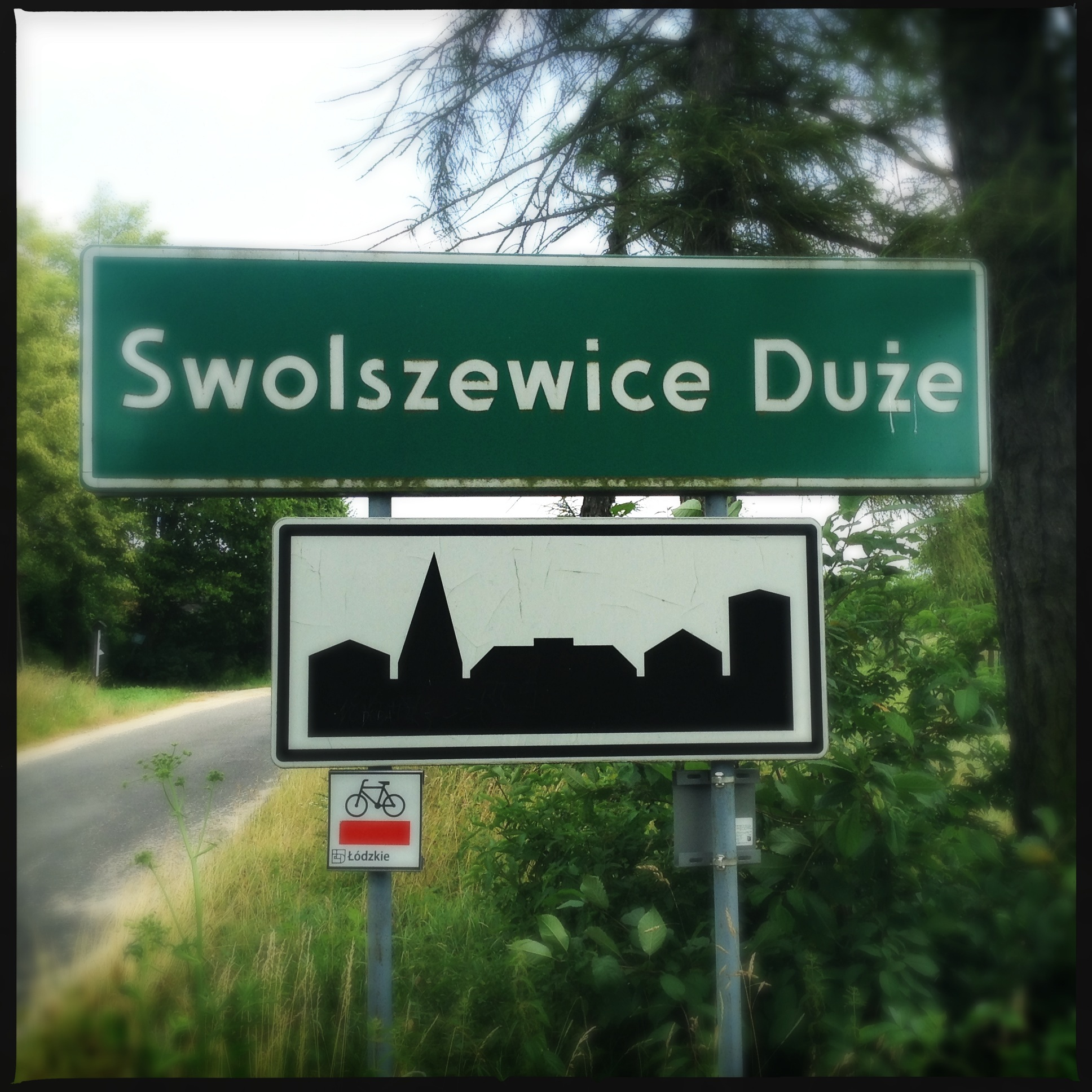

- Location within Poland
- Coordinates: 51°27′55″N 19°56′48″E
- Country: Poland
- Voivodeship: Łódź
- County: Piotrków
- Gmina: Wolbórz

Swolszewice Duże [sfɔlʂɛˈvit͡sɛ ˈduʐɛ] is a village in the administrative district of Gmina Wolbórz, within Piotrków County, Łódź Voivodeship, in central Poland.
