= Zakrzówek-Wieś =

- Village
- Location within Poland
- Coordinates: 50°56′3″N 22°22′4″E
- Country: Poland
- Voivodeship: Lublin
- County: Kraśnik
- Gmina: Zakrzówek
- Population: 543
- Post Code: 23-213
- Area code: (+48) 81
- Vehicle registration: LKR

Zakrzówek-Wieś [zaˈkʂuvɛk ˈvjɛɕ] is a village in the administrative district of Gmina Zakrzówek, within Kraśnik County, Lublin Voivodeship, in eastern Poland.
