= Lipno, Lublin Voivodeship =

Lipno
- Village
- Location within Poland
- Coordinates: 50°58′59″N 22°23′00″E
- Country: Poland
- Voivodeship: Lublin
- County: Kraśnik
- Gmina: Zakrzówek
- Time zone: UTC+1 (CET)
  - Summer (DST): UTC+2 (CEST)

Lipno (Polish pronunciation: [ˈlipnɔ]) is a village in the administrative district of Gmina Zakrzówek, within Kraśnik County, Lublin Voivodeship, in eastern Poland.

== History ==
Three Polish citizens were murdered by Nazi Germany in the village during World War II.
