= Kuznocin, Łódź Voivodeship =

Kuznocin
- Village
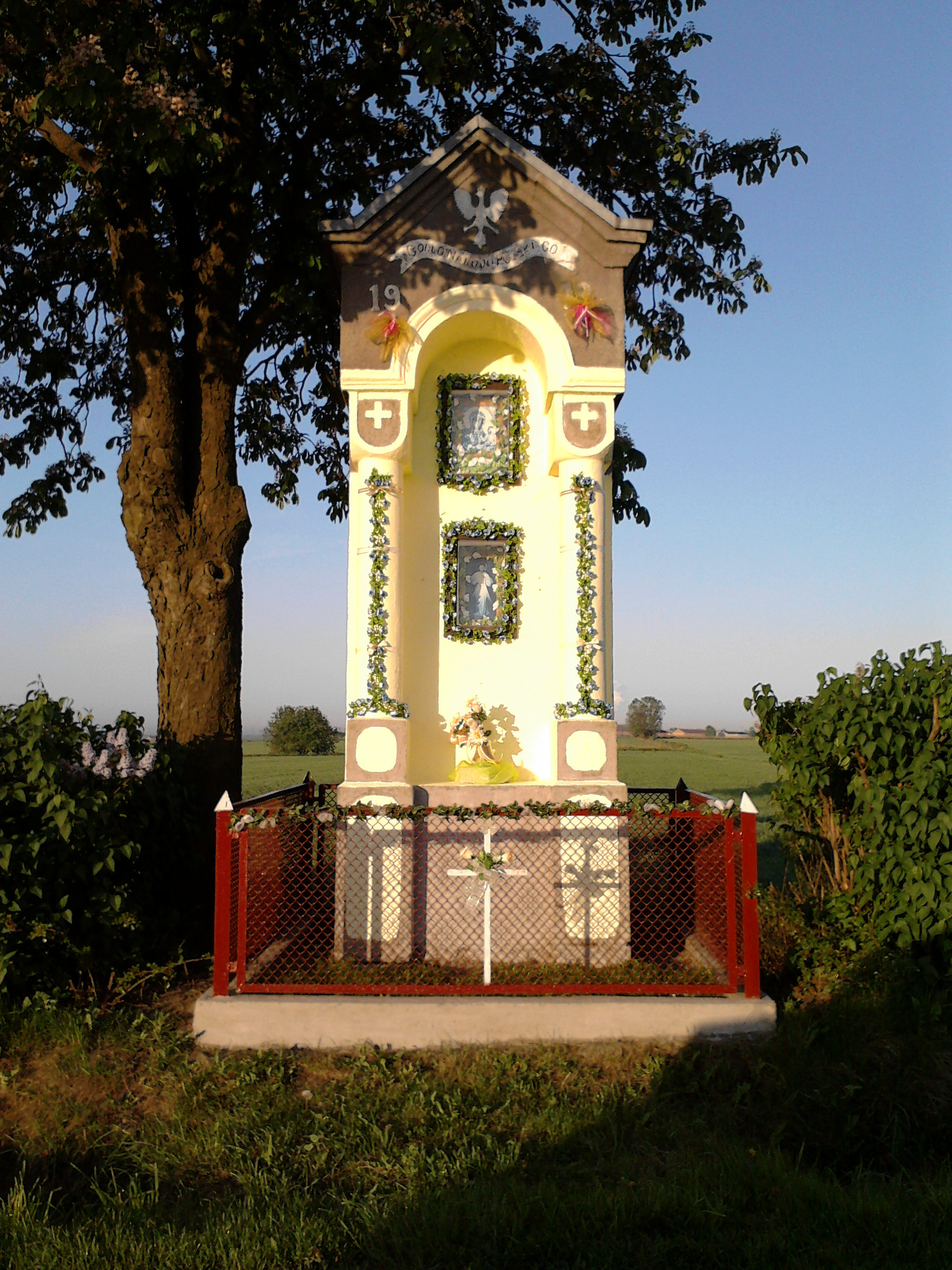

- Location within Poland
- Coordinates: 51°31′N 19°46′E
- Country: Poland
- Voivodeship: Łódź
- County: Piotrków
- Gmina: Wolbórz

Kuznocin [kuzˈnɔt͡ɕin] is a village in the administrative district of Gmina Wolbórz, within Piotrków County, Łódź Voivodeship, in central Poland.
