= Sulów =

- Village
- Location within Poland
- Coordinates: 50°55′N 22°19′E
- Country: Poland
- Voivodeship: Lublin
- County: Kraśnik
- Gmina: Zakrzówek

Sulów [ˈsuluf] is a village in the administrative district of Gmina Zakrzówek, within Kraśnik County, Lublin Voivodeship, in eastern Poland.
