= Młynary, Łódź Voivodeship =

Młynary
- Village
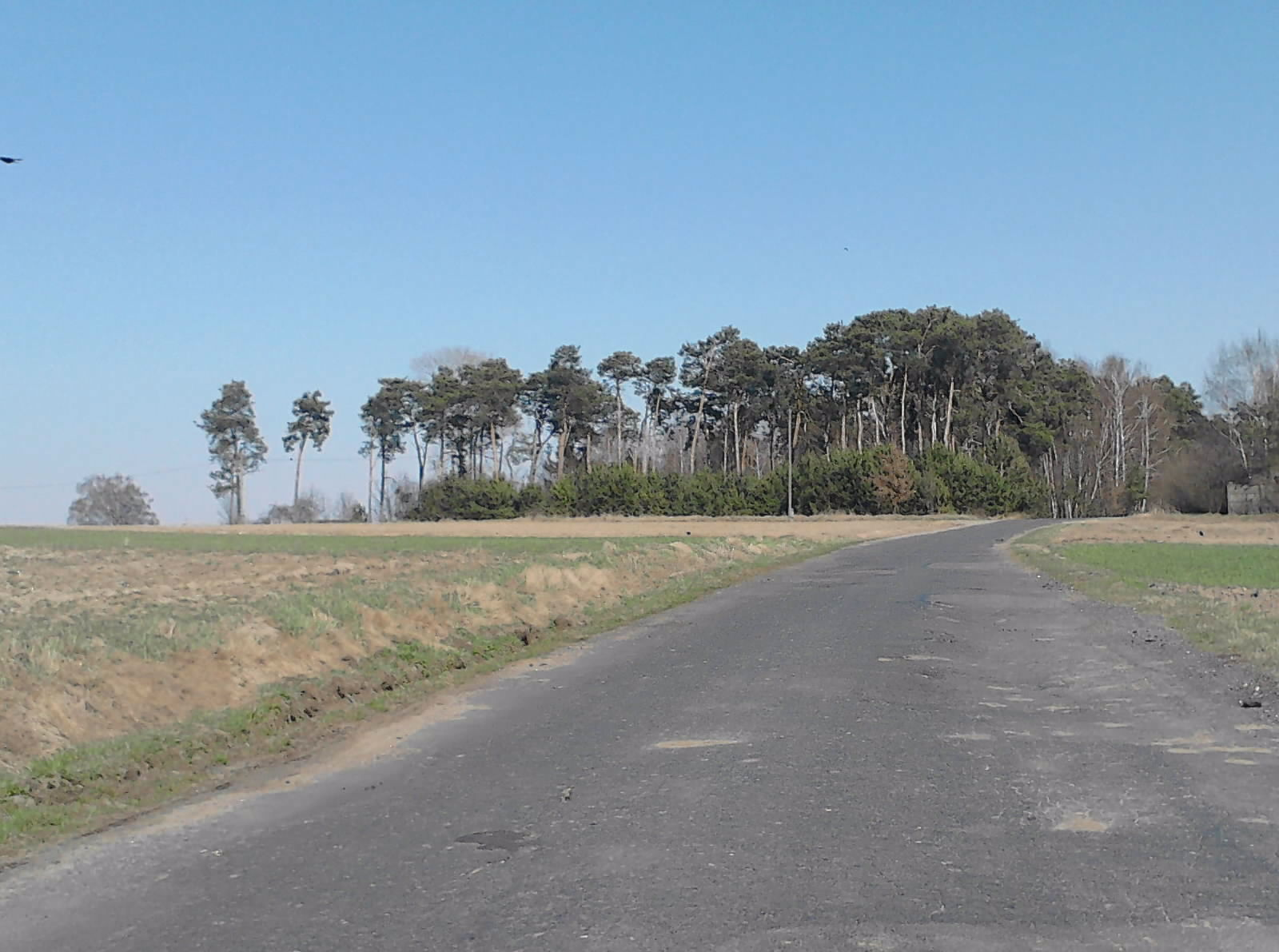

- Location within Poland
- Coordinates: 51°31′N 19°47′E
- Country: Poland
- Voivodeship: Łódź
- County: Piotrków
- Gmina: Wolbórz

Młynary [mwɨˈnarɨ] is a village in the administrative district of Gmina Wolbórz, within Piotrków County, Łódź Voivodeship, in central Poland.
