= Studzianki, Piotrków County =

Studzianki
- Village
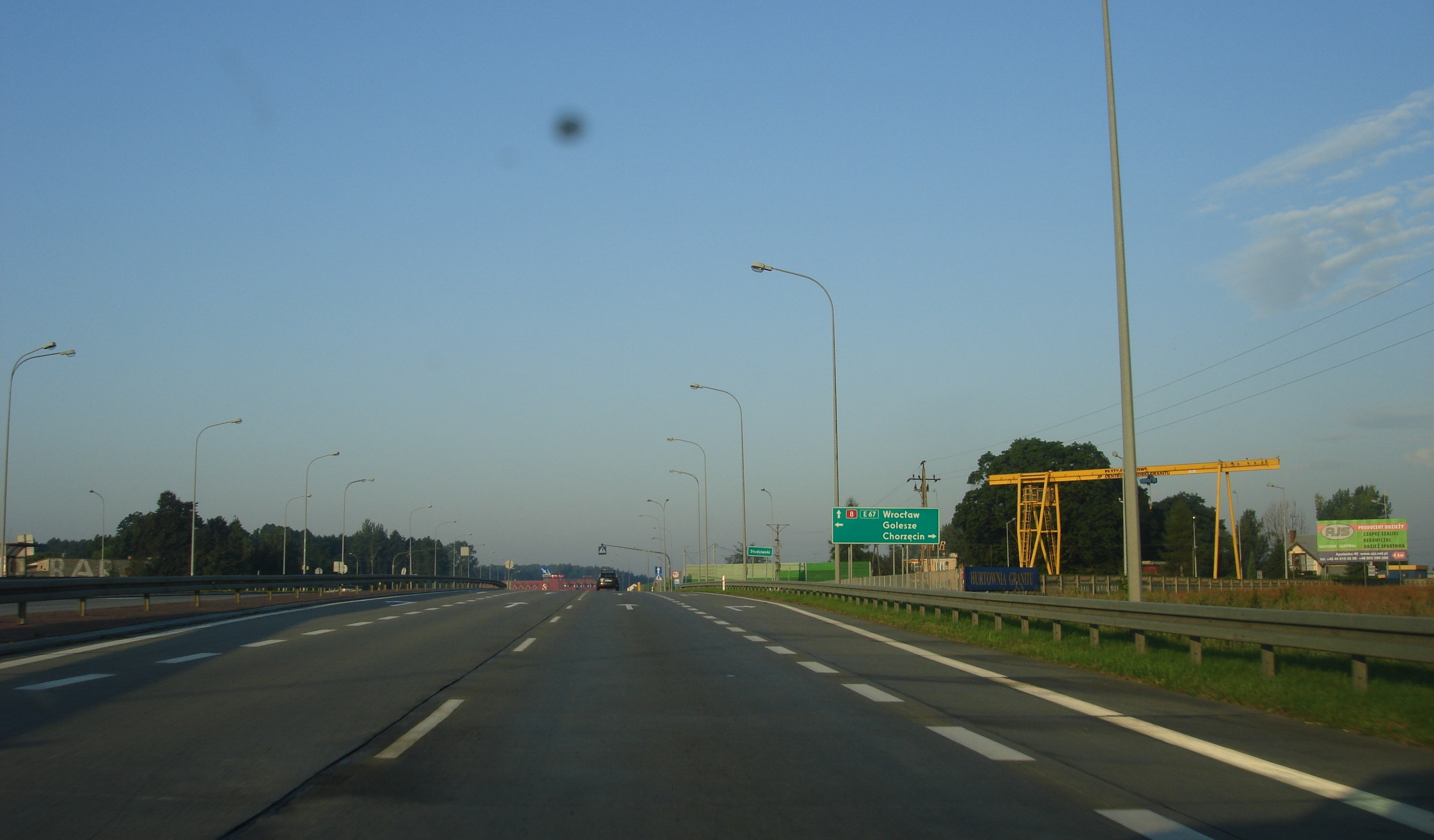

- Location within Poland
- Coordinates: 51°29′57″N 19°54′35″E
- Country: Poland
- Voivodeship: Łódź
- County: Piotrków
- Gmina: Wolbórz

Studzianki [stuˈd͡ʑaŋki] is a village in the administrative district of Gmina Wolbórz, within Piotrków County, Łódź Voivodeship, in central Poland.
