= Dębsko, Łódź Voivodeship =

Dębsko
- Village
- Location within Poland
- Coordinates: 51°27′31″N 19°54′11″E
- Country: Poland
- Voivodeship: Łódź
- County: Piotrków
- Gmina: Wolbórz

Dębsko [ˈdɛmpskɔ] is a village in the administrative district of Gmina Wolbórz, within Piotrków County, Łódź Voivodeship, in central Poland.
