= Bréguet 905 Fauvette =

Single-seat French glider, 1958

Br 905 Fauvette
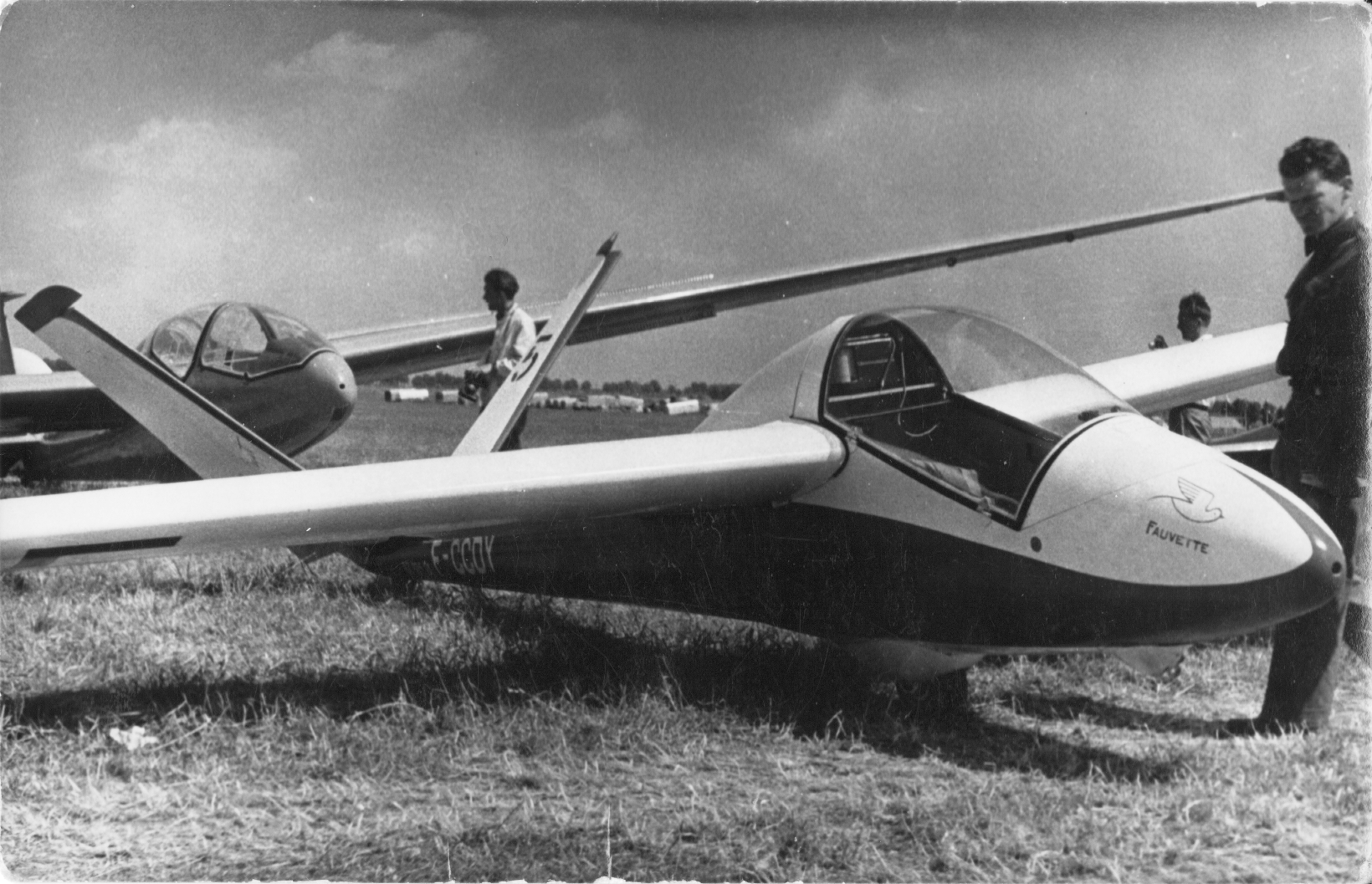
- The first prototype, probably at the 1958 WGC, Leźno

General information
- Type: Single-seat competition sailplane
- National origin: France
- Manufacturer: Société des Ateliers d'Aviation Louis Bréguet (Bréguet Aviation)
- Designer: Jean Cayla
- Number built: 50

History
- First flight: 15 April 1958

The Bréguet Br 905 Fauvette (English: Warbler) is a single-seat, standard class, competition sailplane, designed and produced in France from the late 1950s. Some 50 were built but most remained grounded after a structural accident in 1969; a few remain airworthy.

== Design and development ==
Following Bréguet's success in the 1954 and 1956 World Gliding Championships with the Type 901, Jean Cayla designed the Type 905 for the 1958 event. It is a Standard Class sailplane with a 15 m (49 ft) span. Like its predecessor, the 905 is a cantilever mid-wing monoplane but its structure contains glass reinforced plastic, more plastic foam and less fabric. It also has a butterfly tail. It has a wing of straight tapered planform, terminated with small "salmon" fairings at the squared-off wingtips. The major structural component is the main spar plus nose D-box unit, skinned with a plastic foam-filled ("Klegecel") sandwich with 0.6 mm (0.024 in) ply outer layers. Ribs, ailerons and Schempp-Hirth airbrakes are attached to this torsion box. The whole upper wing surface and outboard lower surface is ply, supported by an internal Klegecell lining, with fabric below, aft of the spar. Slotted ailerons occupy the outer 45% of the trailing edge; there are no flaps. Each complete wing weighs just 34 kg (75 lb).

The Fauvettes's fuselage is built in three parts. The nose section, with a moulded plastic foam shell over a steel frame contains the cockpit, which is covered by a high, one-piece canopy over the upright seating position, giving the Fauvette a somewhat humpbacked look. The centre section also has a steel frame, covered by moulded polystyrene; wings, cockpit and twin fuselage side towing hooks are attached to this frame. Behind the cockpit the upper fuselage line is formed with a polystyrene fairing which overlaps the conical rear fuselage, made of ply-foam sandwich. The V-tail is straight-tapered with sweep on both edges. The fixed surfaces are ply-foam sandwich structures, carrying fabric covered control surfaces. The Fauvette has a fixed, monowheel undercarriage, assisted by a tailskid.

The Type 905 Fauvette flew for the first time on 15 April 1958.

== Bréguet Bre 906 Choucas ==
Bréguet also designed and built a two-seat version of the Fauvette, the 906 Choucas (English: Jackdaw). The Choucas, which first flew on 26 October 1959, was larger and heavier than the Fauvette with an 18 m (59 ft 1 in) span, a length of 8 m (26 ft 3 in) and an empty weight of 245 kg (540 lb). In 1962 they had plans for a production run of one hundred but gained no orders, so only one was built.

== Operational history ==
The Br 905 competed in the 1958 World Gliding Championship at Leźno in Poland as was intended, though it failed to repeat the success of the earlier Bréguet, coming in 9th out of 24 in the Standard Class. It was piloted by Camille Lebar. The Fauvette was well received by those who flew it, reporting light controls, good aileron response and general good behaviour.

Bréguet set up a batch production line for fifty aircraft, all of which had been delivered to customers in several European countries and in North America by the end of January 1961. The Fauvette was available in both flyaway form or as a kit. Some were in private hands by 1959: for example, on 12 June 1959 Tony Goodhart set a new British National Distance record of 617 km (383 mi) in his Fauvette, the 5th, preproduction, aircraft. He also participated in the Italian National Championships in it.

On 11 August 1969 a Fauvette under airtow shed its tail unit, killing the pilot. Investigators found that the bonding between the fuselage and tail unit had failed and the type was grounded. Though a modification involving metal and wood straps to reinforce the bonding was devised, most Fauvettes never flew again. The strengthening added 32 kg (71 lb) to the weight. Of the minority which were modified, some are still registered; in 2010 five Fauvettes remained on the mainland European civil aircraft registers and there were another two in the UK in 2012.

== Variants ==
Data from Bréguet production

905
One Prototype.
905PS
Preproduction aircraft. three built.
905S
Production aircraft. 42 built as flyaway or kit.
905SA
Three built.
905BM
One built.
906 Choucas
Larger, two-seat version. One built.

== Specifications (Bre 905 Fauvette) ==
Data from Jane's All the World's Aircraft 1962/63 The World's Sailplanes:Die Segelflugzeuge der Welt:Les Planeurs du Monde Volume II

General characteristics

- Crew: 1
- Capacity: 1 (906 Choucas)
- Length: 6.30 m (20 ft 8 in)

7.9 m (25 ft 11 in) (906 Choucas)

- Wingspan: 15.0 m (49 ft 3 in)

18 m (59 ft 0.7 in) (906 Choucas)

- Aspect ratio: 20

19 (906 Choucas)

- Airfoil: Root NACA 63420, Tip NACA 63613

(906 Choucas) Root NACA 63820, Tip NACA 63013

- Empty weight: 148 kg (326 lb)

267 kg (589 lb) (906 Choucas)

- Gross weight: 230 kg (507 lb)
- Max takeoff weight: 275 kg (606 lb)

460 kg (1,010 lb) (906 Choucas)

Performance

- Stall speed: 54 km/h (34 mph, 29 kn)

58 km/h (36 mph; 31 kn) (906 Choucas)

- Never exceed speed: 200 km/h (120 mph, 110 kn)
- Rough air speed max: 170 km/h (106 mph; 92 kn)
- Aerotow speed: 120 km/h (75 mph; 65 kn)
- g limits: +5.33 -2.13 at 231 km/h (144 mph; 125 kn)
- Maximum glide ratio: 30 at 78 km/h (48 mph; 42 kn)

31 at 82 km/h (51 mph; 44 kn) (906 Choucas)

- Rate of sink: 0.6 m/s (120 ft/min) minimum at 65 km/h (40 mph; 35 kn)

0.7 m/s (138 ft/min) at 70 km/h (43 mph; 38 kn) (906 Choucas)

- Wing loading: 24.5 kg/m^{2} (5.0 lb/sq ft)

27 kg/m^{2} (5.5 lb/sq ft) (906 Choucas)

== See also ==
Related development

- Bréguet 902 Cinzano
- Bréguet 904 Nymphale
