= Leszno (disambiguation) =

Leszno may refer to the following places:

- Leszno in Greater Poland Voivodeship (west-central Poland)
- Leszno, Kutno County in Łódź Voivodeship (central Poland)
- Leszno, Łęczyca County in Łódź Voivodeship (central Poland)
- Leszno, Subcarpathian Voivodeship (south-east Poland)
- Leszno, Przasnysz County in Masovian Voivodeship (east-central Poland)
- Leszno, Warsaw West County in Masovian Voivodeship (east-central Poland)
- Leszno, Kartuzy County in Pomeranian Voivodeship (north Poland)
- Leszno, Warmian-Masurian Voivodeship (north Poland)

== See also ==
- Leźno
- Leśno (disambiguation)
