= Budki =

Budki may refer to the following places:

- Budki, Łódź Voivodeship (central Poland)
- Budki, Kraśnik County in Lublin Voivodeship (east Poland)
- Budki, Lubartów County in Lublin Voivodeship (east Poland)
- Budki, Łuków County in Lublin Voivodeship (east Poland)
- Budki, Garwolin County in Masovian Voivodeship (east-central Poland)
- Budki, Przasnysz County in Masovian Voivodeship (east-central Poland)
- Budki, Szydłowiec County in Masovian Voivodeship (east-central Poland)
- Budki, Pomeranian Voivodeship (north Poland)
- Budki, Warmian-Masurian Voivodeship (north Poland)
