= GAC =

Gac or GAC may refer to:

- Gac, fruit of the species Momordica cochinchinensis
- Gać (disambiguation), a common Polish place name

== Acronyms ==
=== Companies and organisations ===
- GAC Group, a Chinese automotive company based in Guangzhou, Guangdong
- GAC Ireland, an Irish bus manufacturer established with Bombardier (1980–1986)
- Games Administration Committee, a committee that organises fixtures within Gaelic games
- Gateway Athletic Conference, a suburban St. Louis high school extracurricular league in Missouri
- Geological Association of Canada
- Global Action for Children, an organization advocating for vulnerable children in the developing world
- Global Affairs Canada, a department of the Canadian federal government
- Gloster Aircraft Company, an aircraft manufacturing company based in Gloucester, England
- Grumman Aerospace Corporation, an American military and civilian aircraft manufacturer
- Gulfstream Aerospace Corporation, an American business jet aircraft manufacturer

=== Entertainment ===
- Ghost Adventures Crew, the team featured on the Ghost Adventures television series
- Graphic Adventure Creator, a game creation system of the 1980s by Incentive software
- General Amusement Corporation, an entertainment booking agency founded in the early 1930s
- Great American Family, a family-oriented general entertainment cable TV channel formerly known as Great American Country

=== Technology ===
- Global Assembly Cache, a component of Microsoft's .NET Framework
- Generic Artificial Consciousness, a database and software of Mindpixel
- Granular activated carbon, a highly porous and absorbent material used extensively in water filtration

=== Other uses ===
- Globular Amphora culture, an archaeological culture in central Europe
- Global Assessment Certificate, a university preparation and foundation studies program
- Great American Conference, an NCAA Division II Conference formed in 2010
- Guglielmo Achille Cavellini (1914–1990), influential art collector and mail artist
- Gender Affirming Care, an extension of the acronym "GAC"
- GAC, a codon for the amino acid aspartic acid

== See also ==
- Le Gac, people with this French surname
- Gach, Beyhaq Rural District, Sheshtomad District, Sabzevar County, Razavi Khorasan Province, Iran
- Gack, Gmina Drawno, Choszczno County, West Pomeranian Voivodeship, Poland
- Gak
