= Smardzew =

Smardzew may refer to the following places:

- Smardzew, Łęczyca County in Łódź Voivodeship (central Poland)
- Smardzew, Sieradz County in Łódź Voivodeship (central Poland)
- Smardzew, Zgierz County in Łódź Voivodeship (central Poland)
- Smardzew, Masovian Voivodeship (east-central Poland)
