= Smolice =

Smolice may refer to the following places:

- Smolice, Lesser Poland Voivodeship (south Poland)
- Smolice, Łęczyca County in Łódź Voivodeship (central Poland)
- Smolice, Zgierz County in Łódź Voivodeship (central Poland)
- Smolice, Greater Poland Voivodeship (west-central Poland)
- Smolice, Opole Voivodeship (south-west Poland)
