= Ostrówek =

Ostrówek may refer to the following places in Poland:

In Greater Poland Voivodeship (west-central Poland):

- Ostrówek, Kalisz County
- Ostrówek, Piła County
- Ostrówek, Słupca County
- Ostrówek, Turek County
- Ostrówek, Gmina Sompolno
- Ostrówek, Gmina Wierzbinek
- Ostrówek, Gmina Wilczyn
- Ostrówek, part of the Śródka district of Poznań, formerly a town in its own right

In Kuyavian-Pomeranian Voivodeship (north-central Poland):

- Ostrówek, Inowrocław County
- Ostrówek, Sępólno County

In Łódź Voivodeship (central Poland):

- Ostrówek, Łęczyca County
- Ostrówek, Wieluń County
- Ostrówek, Wieruszów County
- Ostrówek, Zduńska Wola County

In Lublin Voivodeship (east Poland):

- Ostrówek, Hrubieszów County
- Ostrówek, Krasnystaw County
- Ostrówek, Łęczna County
- Ostrówek, Lubartów County

In Masovian Voivodeship (east-central Poland):

- Ostrówek, Grójec County
- Ostrówek, Otwock County
- Ostrówek, Siedlce County
- Ostrówek, Sokołów County
- Ostrówek, Węgrów County
- Ostrówek, Wyszków County
- Ostrówek, Gmina Dąbrówka
- Ostrówek, Gmina Klembów

In Podlaskie Voivodeship (north-east Poland):

- Ostrówek, Bielsk County
- Ostrówek, Gmina Sokółka
- Ostrówek, Gmina Suchowola
- Ostrówek, Gmina Szudziałowo

In Subcarpathian Voivodeship (south-east Poland):

- Ostrówek, Mielec County
- Ostrówek, Stalowa Wola County

== Others ==
- Ostrówek, Pomeranian Voivodeship (north Poland)
- Ostrówek, West Pomeranian Voivodeship (northwest Poland)
