= Leźno railway station =

Railway station in Leźno, Poland

Coordinates: 54°20′42″N 18°27′24″E

Leźno
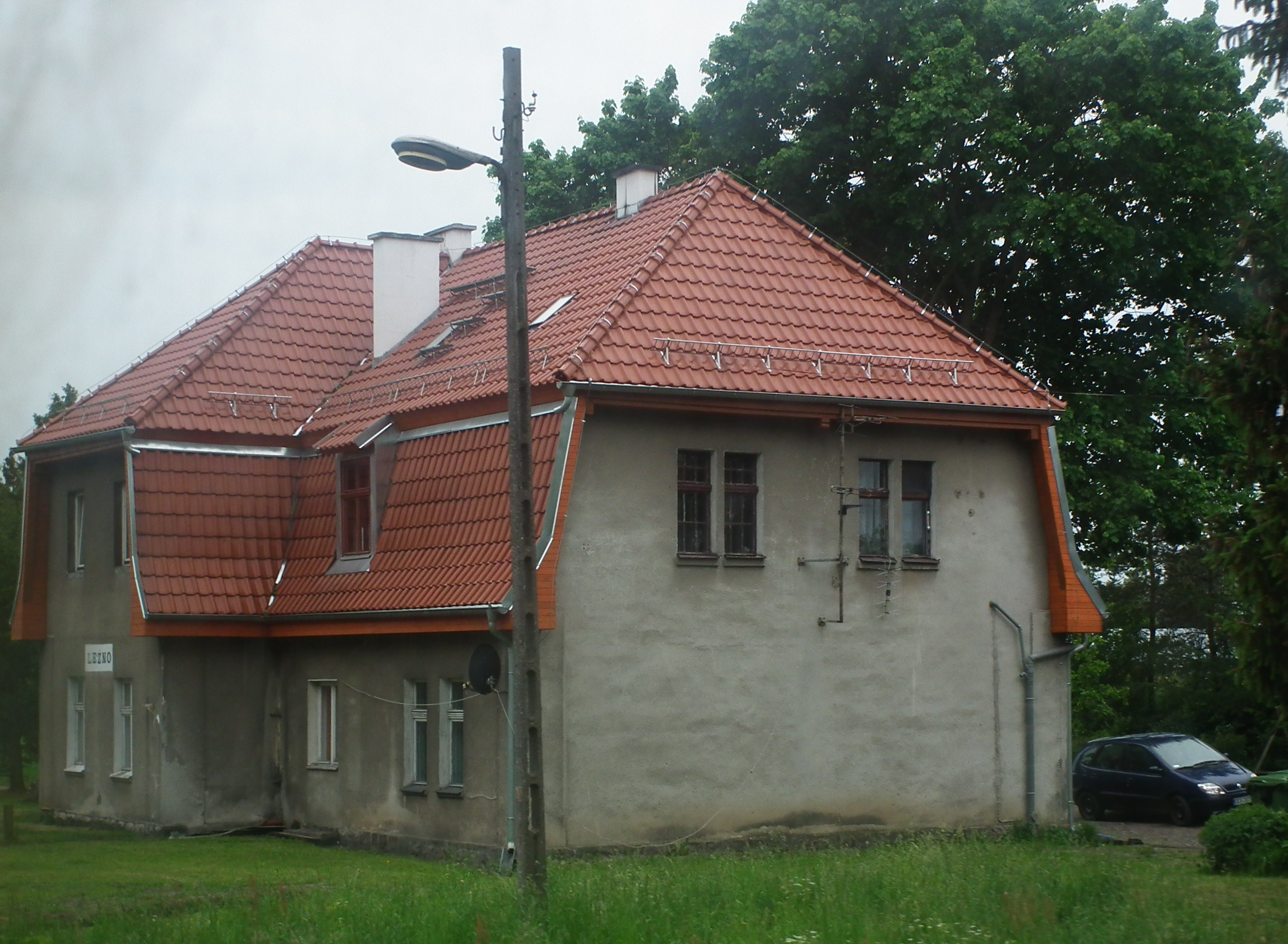

General information
- Location: Leźno; Poland
- Owner: Polskie Koleje Państwowe S.A.
- Platforms: 1

Construction
- Structure type: Building: Yes (no longer used); Depot: Never existed Water tower: Never existed

History
- Former names: Leesen until 1945
Location

Leźno is a non-operational PKP railway station in Leźno (Pomeranian Voivodeship), Poland.

== Lines crossing the station ==
Start station	End station	Line type
Gdańsk Wrzeszcz	Stara Piła	Freight
