= Maria Hempel =

Polish botanist (1834–1904)

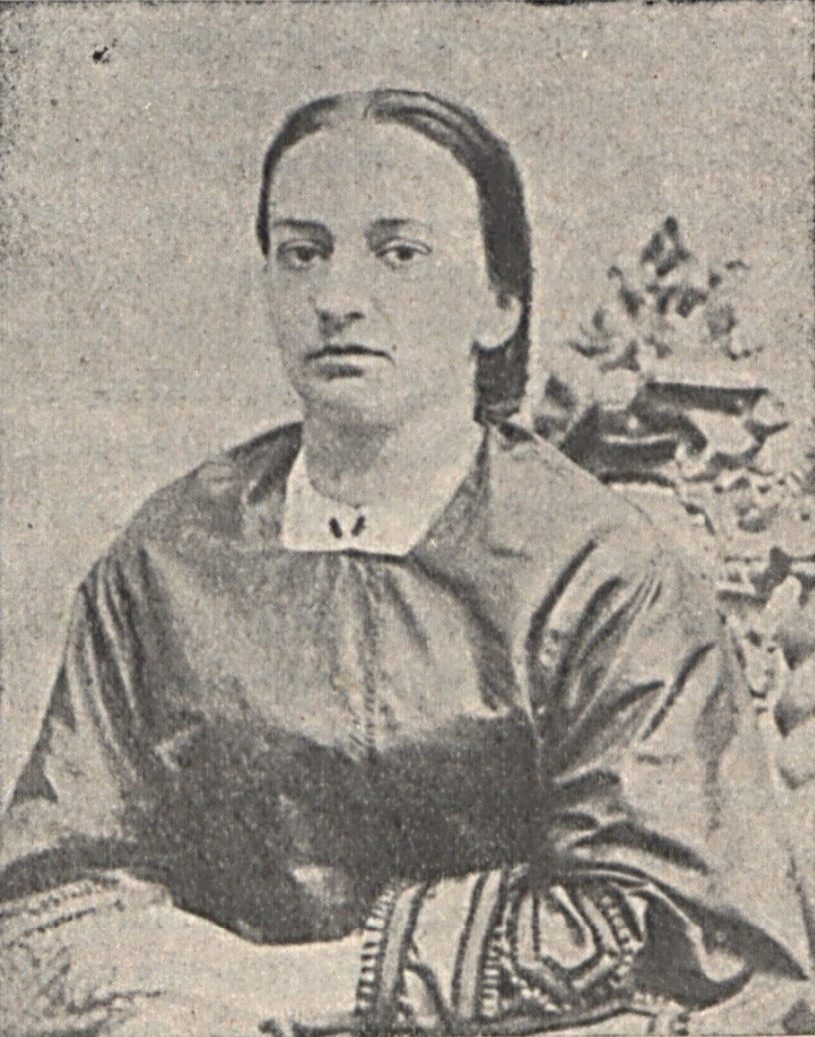
- Born: Maria Hemplówna; May 6, 1834; Brzeziny, Congress Poland
- Died: February 3, 1904 (aged 69); Węglin, Congress Poland
- Resting place: Rzeczyca Ziemiańska
- Occupation: Ethnobotanist
- Known for: Ethnobotany in the Lublin region
- Notable work: Pamiętnik Fizjograficzny (1885)
- Spouse: Kazmierz Łapczyński

Maria Hempel (born Maria Hemplówna; 6 May 1834 – 3 February 1904) was a Polish ethnobotanist, known for her study of plants in what is now the Lublin Voivodeship.

== Biography ==
Hempel was born in Brzeziny, the daughter of Aleksander Klemens and Maria Klemens (née Bogdanowicz). In 1857, she became engaged to her cousin, Kazimierz Łapczyński, an engineer who was also involved in the study of botany. That same year, Hempel's mother died, necessitating Hempel to begin caring for her younger siblings.

Hempel was involved in the Polish patriotic movement against the Russian occupation of Congress Poland, part of Poland which was under the control of Russian Empire. She was a member of the Chełm Women's Committee, and during the January Uprising in 1863, Hempel acted as a courier and intelligence officer, and helped to supply and hide insurgents.

Until 1875, Hempel lived in an estate in Tarnów. After the home was sold, she stayed with various relatives and friends, helping them to run their households, including in Słupia Nadbrzeżna, Skorczyce, Nadrybie, Samoklęski and Węglin.

Hempel died in 1904 in Węglin, and was buried in the cemetery in Rzeczyca Ziemiańska. In May 2023, the Lublin branch of the Institute of National Remembrance renovated Hempel's tombstone, and her grave as added to the Register of Graves of Veterans of the Fights for Poland's Freedom and Independence.

== Career ==
=== Botany ===
Hempel documented and collected plant species native to the eastern Lublin region and the left bank of the Vistula. In 1881, she discovered the only known Polish location of the carline thistle in Stawska Góra (today the Stawska Góra Nature Reserve).

A collection of Hempel's articles on local botanical studies were published in Pamiętnik Fizjograficzny in 1885. After her husband's death, she published his work in Flora Litwy w Pan Tadeuszu in 1894.

Herbarium sheets collected by Hempel of vascular plants in the Lublin region are currently owned by the Department of Botany, Mycology and Ecology at Maria Curie-Skłodowska University.

=== Ethnobotany ===
Hempel supported Oskar Kolberg to collect ethnographic materials of the Chełm region for his monograph of the region. She also supported Józef Rostafiński's 1883 survey on the folk names and use of plants in Polish communities.
