= Odechów =

Odechów may refer to the following places in Poland:

- Odechów, Łódź Voivodeship (central Poland)
- Odechów, Masovian Voivodeship (east-central Poland)
