= Piotrkówek =

Piotrkówek may refer to the following places:

- Piotrkówek, Łódź Voivodeship (central Poland)
- Piotrkówek, Lublin Voivodeship (east Poland)
- Piotrkówek, Masovian Voivodeship (east-central Poland)
