= Jaworów =

Jaworów may refer to:

- Jaworów, Lower Silesian Voivodeship (south-west Poland)
- Jaworów, Łódź Voivodeship (central Poland)
- Jaworów, Lublin Voivodeship (east Poland)
- the Polish name for the town of Yavoriv in Ukraine (also named previously Yavorov in Russian)

== See also ==
- Jaworowo (disambiguation)
