= Srebrna =

Srebrna may refer to the following places:

- Srebrna, Łódź Voivodeship (central Poland)
- Srebrna, Płock County in Masovian Voivodeship (east-central Poland)
- Srebrna, Podlaskie Voivodeship (north-east Poland)
- Srebrna, Płońsk County in Masovian Voivodeship (east-central Poland)
