= Sławęcin =

Sławęcin may refer to the following places in Poland:

- Sławęcin, Lower Silesian Voivodeship (south-west Poland)
- Sławęcin, Inowrocław County in Kuyavian-Pomeranian Voivodeship (north-central Poland)
- Sławęcin, Gmina Chodecz in Kuyavian-Pomeranian Voivodeship (north-central Poland)
- Sławęcin, Gmina Lubień Kujawski in Kuyavian-Pomeranian Voivodeship (north-central Poland)
- Sławęcin, Łódź Voivodeship (central Poland)
- Sławęcin, Lublin Voivodeship (east Poland)
- Sławęcin, Subcarpathian Voivodeship (south-east Poland)
- Sławęcin, Masovian Voivodeship (east-central Poland)
- Sławęcin, Pomeranian Voivodeship (north Poland)
- Sławęcin, Choszczno County in West Pomeranian Voivodeship (north-west Poland)
- Sławęcin, Szczecinek County in West Pomeranian Voivodeship (north-west Poland)
