= Nagórki =

Nagórki may refer to the following places:

- Nagórki, Kuyavian-Pomeranian Voivodeship (north-central Poland)
- Nagórki, Łódź Voivodeship (central Poland)
- Nagórki, Podlaskie Voivodeship (north-east Poland)
