= Kotków =

Kotków may refer to the following places:

- Kotków, Łęczyca County in Łódź Voivodeship (central Poland)
- Kotków, Piotrków County in Łódź Voivodeship (central Poland)
- Kotków, Gliwice County in Silesian Voivodeship (south Poland)
