= Leśno =

Leśno may refer to the following places:

- Leśno, Bytów County in Pomeranian Voivodeship (north Poland)
- Leśno, Chojnice County in Pomeranian Voivodeship (north Poland)
- Leśno, Wejherowo County in Pomeranian Voivodeship (north Poland)
- Leśno, Leszczyński County

== See also ==
- Leźno
- Leszno (disambiguation)
