= Jastrzębia =

Jastrzębia may refer to:

- Jastrzębia, Lower Silesian Voivodeship (south-west Poland)
- Jastrzębia, Kutno County in Łódź Voivodeship (central Poland)
- Jastrzębia, Łęczyca County in Łódź Voivodeship (central Poland)
- Jastrzębia, Łowicz County in Łódź Voivodeship (central Poland)
- Jastrzębia, Tarnów County in Lesser Poland Voivodeship (south Poland)
- Jastrzębia, Wadowice County in Lesser Poland Voivodeship (south Poland)
- Jastrzębia, Świętokrzyskie Voivodeship (south-central Poland)
- Jastrzębia, Grójec County in Masovian Voivodeship (east-central Poland)
- Jastrzębia, Radom County in Masovian Voivodeship (east-central Poland)
