= Fauvette =

Fauvette may refer to:-

- French patrol vessel Fauvette, a World War I patrol vessel of the French Navy, also saw service as Fauvette I
- Breguet Br 905 Fauvette, a French glider
- La fauvette du temple, an 1885 comic opera
