= GAK =

Gak or GAK may refer to:

== People ==
- Akoldah Gak (born 2002), Australian basketball player, brother of Gorjuk Gak
- Gorjok Gak (born 1996), Egyptian-born Australian basketball player
- Huh Gak (born 1984), South Korean singer
- Kim Gak (1536–1610), Korean military officer and poet
- Gak Jonze (born 1982), stage name of English rapper Micah Lei

== Places ==
- Ağdam, Khojavend (also Gak), a village in the Khojavend Rayon of Azerbaijan
- Gak, South Sudan, a boma in Kolnyang payam, Bor South County, Jonglei State

== Other uses ==
- GAK (EP), a 1994 recording by Richard D. James
- GAK (protein), a serine/threonine kinase that in humans is encoded by the GAK gene
- Gamkonora language (ISO 639-3 code: gak), a North Halmahera language of Indonesia
- Grazer AK, an Austrian sports club
- Nickelodeon Gak/Floam, a 1990s children's toy (a non-Newtonian fluid made from guar gum, like Silly Putty/Slime)

== See also ==
- Gac (disambiguation)
