= Radzyń =

Radzyń may refer to:

- Radzyń County, Lublin Voivodeship, a county in eastern Poland
- Radzyń Podlaski, Lublin Voivodeship, a town in eastern Poland
- Radzyń Chełmiński, Kuyavian-Pomeranian Voivodeship, a town in north central Poland
- Radzyń, Łódź Voivodeship, a village in central Poland
- Radzyń, Lubusz Voivodeship, a village in western Poland
- Lords of Radzyn Keep, characters in Melanie Rawn's fantasy novels of the Dragon Prince series including Chay, Tobin, Maarken, etc.
