= Bréguet 902 Cinzano =

Two-seat French glider, 1957

Br 902 Cinzano

General information
- Type: Glider
- National origin: France
- Manufacturer: Société anonyme des Ateliers d'aviation Louis Bréguet
- Designer: Jean Cayla / R. Jarlaud
- Number built: 6

History
- First flight: 14 May 1957

The Bréguet Br 902 Cinzano was a French training glider produced in the 1950s by Société anonyme des Ateliers d'aviation Louis Bréguet

== Design and development ==
In response to a need for replacing the Caudron C.800 training glider with a contemporary high performance trainer, Bréguet designed and built the Br 902 Cinzano prototype, with parts in common with the Br 901 and Br 904. Production aircraft would have been optimised for production and also used new manufacturing techniques, particularly for the wings, which were intended to be built using the hollow shell method; high-accuracy plywood skins laid up in jig moulds with structure added in the mould to retain the high accuracy surfaces.

Construction was of welded steel tube for the fuselage with wood for wings and empennage. The fuselage was covered in fabric, with plywood for areas requiring more resilience. Flying controls, wings and empennage were built up from wood with plywood high strength members, covered with fabric. The instructor and pupil sat in closed tandem cockpits covered with Plexiglass canopies. Control was via conventional ailerons, elevators, operated by rods and rudder operated by cables, with airbrakes on the wings for approach control. The undercarriage consisted of a single mainwheel fitted with a hydraulic brake, rubber sprung tail-skid, with protection skids on the wing-tips.

The first prototype, Br 902-01, flew for the first time on 14 May 1957 piloted by Paul Lepanse, but despite good performance and flying characteristics, the Br 902 failed to sell well; only a small production run of 6 gliders was built.

== Specifications (Br 902) ==
Data from Planeurs: Breguet Br-902 Cinzano, Aviafrance : Breguet Br 902, OSTIV 1958

General characteristics

- Crew: 2
- Length: 9 m (29 ft 6 in)
- Wingspan: 18 m (59 ft 1 in)
- Wing area: 21.6 m^{2} (233 sq ft)
- Aspect ratio: 15
- Airfoil: NACA 63 modified
- Empty weight: 330 kg (728 lb)
- Gross weight: 500 kg (1,102 lb)

Performance

- Stall speed: 60 km/h (37 mph, 32 kn)
- Never exceed speed: 220 km/h (140 mph, 120 kn)
- Maximum glide ratio: 28 at 78 km/h (48 mph; 42 kn)
- Rate of sink: 0.7 m/s (140 ft/min) at 65 km/h (40 mph; 35 kn)
- Wing loading: 23 kg/m^{2} (4.7 lb/sq ft)

== Bibliography ==
- Cuny, Jean & Leyvastre, Pierre (1977). Les Avions Breguet (1940/1971). DOCAVIA (in French). Vol. 6. Paris: Editions Larivière. OCLC 440863702.
- Lacaze, Henri (2016). Les avions Louis Breguet Paris [The Aircraft of Louis Breguet, Paris] (in French). Vol. 2: le règne du monoplan. Le Vigen, France. ISBN 978-2-914017-89-3.
