= Biała Góra, Łęczyca County =

Biała Góra
- Village
- Location within Poland
- Coordinates: 52°8′1″N 18°57′34″E
- Country: Poland
- Voivodeship: Łódź
- County: Łęczyca
- Gmina: Grabów

Biała Góra [ˈbjawa ˈɡura] is a village in the administrative district of Gmina Grabów, within Łęczyca County, Łódź Voivodeship, in central Poland.
