= Owczarnia, Kraśnik County =

Owczarnia
- Village
- Location within Poland
- Coordinates: 50°53′N 22°12′E
- Country: Poland
- Voivodeship: Lublin
- County: Kraśnik
- Gmina: Trzydnik Duży

Owczarnia [ɔfˈt͡ʂarɲa] is a village in the administrative district of Gmina Trzydnik Duży, within Kraśnik County, Lublin Voivodeship, in eastern Poland.
