= Trzydnik Mały =

- Village
- Location within Poland
- Coordinates: 50°51′N 22°8′E
- Country: Poland
- Voivodeship: Lublin
- County: Kraśnik
- Gmina: Trzydnik Duży
- Time zone: UTC+1 (CET)
  - Summer (DST): UTC+2 (CEST)

Trzydnik Mały [ˈtʂɨdnik ˈmawɨ] is a village in the administrative district of Gmina Trzydnik Duży, within Kraśnik County, Lublin Voivodeship, in eastern Poland.

== History ==
Three Polish citizens were murdered by Nazi Germany in the village during World War II.
