= Gać =

Gać may refer to the following places in Poland:

- Gać, Lower Silesian Voivodeship (south-west Poland)
- Gać, Kuyavian-Pomeranian Voivodeship (north-central Poland)
- Gać, Podlaskie Voivodeship (north-east Poland)
- Gać, Łódź Voivodeship (central Poland)
- Gać, Subcarpathian Voivodeship (south-east Poland)
- Gać, Masovian Voivodeship (east-central Poland)
- Gać, Gmina Główczyce in Pomeranian Voivodeship (north Poland)
- Gać, Gmina Słupsk in Pomeranian Voivodeship (north Poland)
