= Piaski, Gmina Grabów =

Piaski
- Village
- Location within Poland
- Coordinates: 52°06′03″N 18°59′36″E
- Country: Poland
- Voivodeship: Łódź
- County: Łęczyca
- Gmina: Grabów

Piaski (Polish pronunciation: [ˈpjaskʲi]) is a village in the administrative district of Gmina Grabów, within Łęczyca County, Łódź Voivodeship, in central Poland.
