= Kurzjama =

- Village
- Location within Poland
- Coordinates: 52°9′N 19°2′E
- Country: Poland
- Voivodeship: Łódź
- County: Łęczyca
- Gmina: Grabów

Kurzjama [kuʐˈjama] is a village in the administrative district of Gmina Grabów, within Łęczyca County, Łódź Voivodeship, in central Poland.
