= Sobótka-Kolonia =

- Village
- Location within Poland
- Coordinates: 52°10′45″N 19°02′53″E
- Country: Poland
- Voivodeship: Łódź
- County: Łęczyca
- Gmina: Grabów

Sobótka-Kolonia [sɔˈbutka kɔˈlɔɲa] is a village in the administrative district of Gmina Grabów, within Łęczyca County, Łódź Voivodeship, in central Poland.
