= Gmina Grabów =

Gmina Grabów Grabów Commune
- Gmina

- Flag Coat of arms
- Interactive map of Gmina Grabów
- Coordinates (Grabów): 52°8′N 19°1′E
- Country: Poland
- Voivodeship: Łódź
- County: Łęczyca
- Seat: Grabów

Area
  - Total: 154.84 km^{2} (59.78 sq mi)

Population (2006)
  - Total: 6,480
  - Density: 41.8/km^{2} (108/sq mi)
- Time zone: UTC+1 (CET)
  - Summer (DST): UTC+2 (CEST)
- Website: www.grabow.com.pl

Gmina Grabów is a rural gmina (administrative district) in Łęczyca County, Łódź Voivodeship, in central Poland. Its seat is the village of Grabów, which lies 16 kilometres (10 mi) north-west of Łęczyca and 50 km (31 mi) north-west of the regional capital Łódź.

The gmina covers an area of 154.84 square kilometres (59.8 sq mi), and in 2006 had a population of 6,480.

== Villages ==
Gmina Grabów contains the villages and settlements of:

- Besiekiery
- Biała Góra
- Borów
- Borucice
- Bowętów
- Brudzeń
- Budki
- Byszew
- Chorki
- Gać
- Golbice
- Goszczędza
- Grabów
- Jastrzębia
- Jaworów
- Kadzidłowa
- Kotków
- Ksawerów
- Kurzjama
- Leszno
- Nagórki
- Nowa Sobótka
- Nowy Besk
- Odechów
- Ostrówek
- Piaski
- Pieczew
- Piotrkówek
- Radzyń
- Sławęcin
- Smardzew
- Smolice
- Sobótka-Kolonia
- Srebrna
- Stara Sobótka
- Stary Besk
- Wygorzele
- Żaczki
- Źrebięta

== Neighbouring gminas ==
Gmina Grabów is bordered by the gminas of Chodów, Dąbie, Daszyna, Kłodawa, Łęczyca, Olszówka and Świnice Warckie.
