= Liśnik Mały =

- Village
- Location within Poland
- Coordinates: 50°53′25″N 22°05′37″E
- Country: Poland
- Voivodeship: Lublin
- County: Kraśnik
- Gmina: Trzydnik Duży

Liśnik Mały [ˈliɕnik ˈmawɨ] is a village in the administrative district of Gmina Trzydnik Duży, within Kraśnik County, Lublin Voivodeship, in eastern Poland.
