= Żaczki =

- Village
- Location within Poland
- Coordinates: 52°08′32″N 19°02′37″E
- Country: Poland
- Voivodeship: Łódź
- County: Łęczyca
- Gmina: Grabów

Żaczki [ˈʐat͡ʂki] is a village in the administrative district of Gmina Grabów, within Łęczyca County, Łódź Voivodeship, in central Poland.
