= Grabów, Łęczyca County =

Grabów
- Town
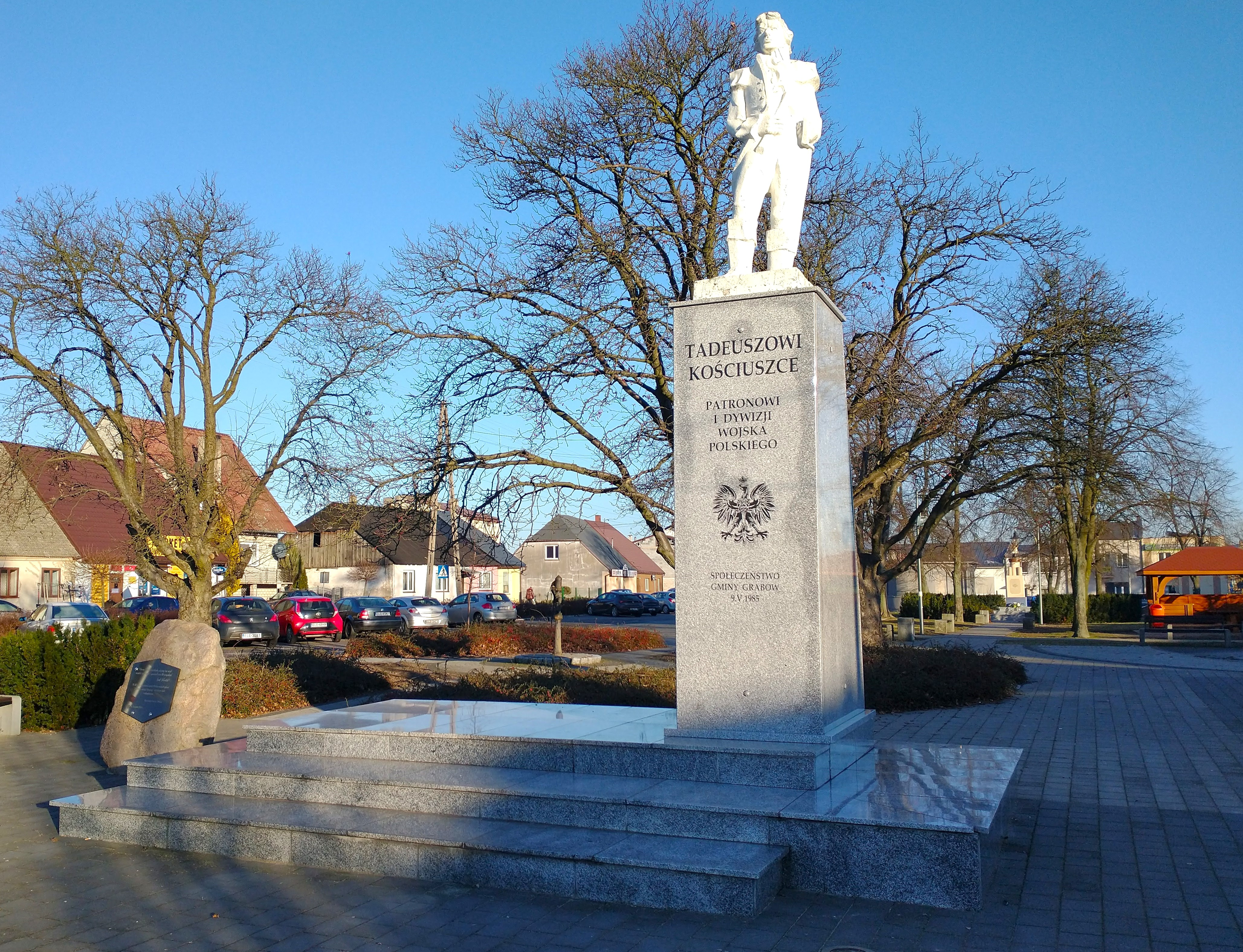
- Tadeusz Kościuszko Monument in Grabów

- Flag Coat of arms

- Location within Poland
- Coordinates: 52°8′N 19°1′E
- Country: Poland
- Voivodeship: Łódź
- County: Łęczyca
- Gmina: Grabów

Population
  - Total: 1,300
- Time zone: UTC+1 (CET)
  - Summer (DST): UTC+2 (CEST)
- Postal code: 99-150
- Vehicle registration: ELE
- Website: http://www.grabow.com.pl

Grabów [ˈɡrabuf] is a town in Łęczyca County, Łódź Voivodeship, in central Poland. It is the seat of the gmina (administrative district) called Gmina Grabów. It lies approximately 16 km (10 mi) north-west of Łęczyca and 50 km (31 mi) north-west of the regional capital Łódź. It is located within the historic Łęczyca Land.

== History ==
Grabów was a private town, administratively located in the Łęczyca County in the Łęczyca Voivodeship in the Greater Poland Province of the Kingdom of Poland.
