= Wólka Olbięcka =

- Village
- Location within Poland
- Coordinates: 50°55′N 22°8′E
- Country: Poland
- Voivodeship: Lublin
- County: Kraśnik
- Gmina: Trzydnik Duży

Wólka Olbięcka [ˈvulka ɔlˈbjɛnt͡ska] is a village in the administrative district of Gmina Trzydnik Duży, within Kraśnik County, Lublin Voivodeship, in Eastern Poland.
