= Goszczędza =

- Village
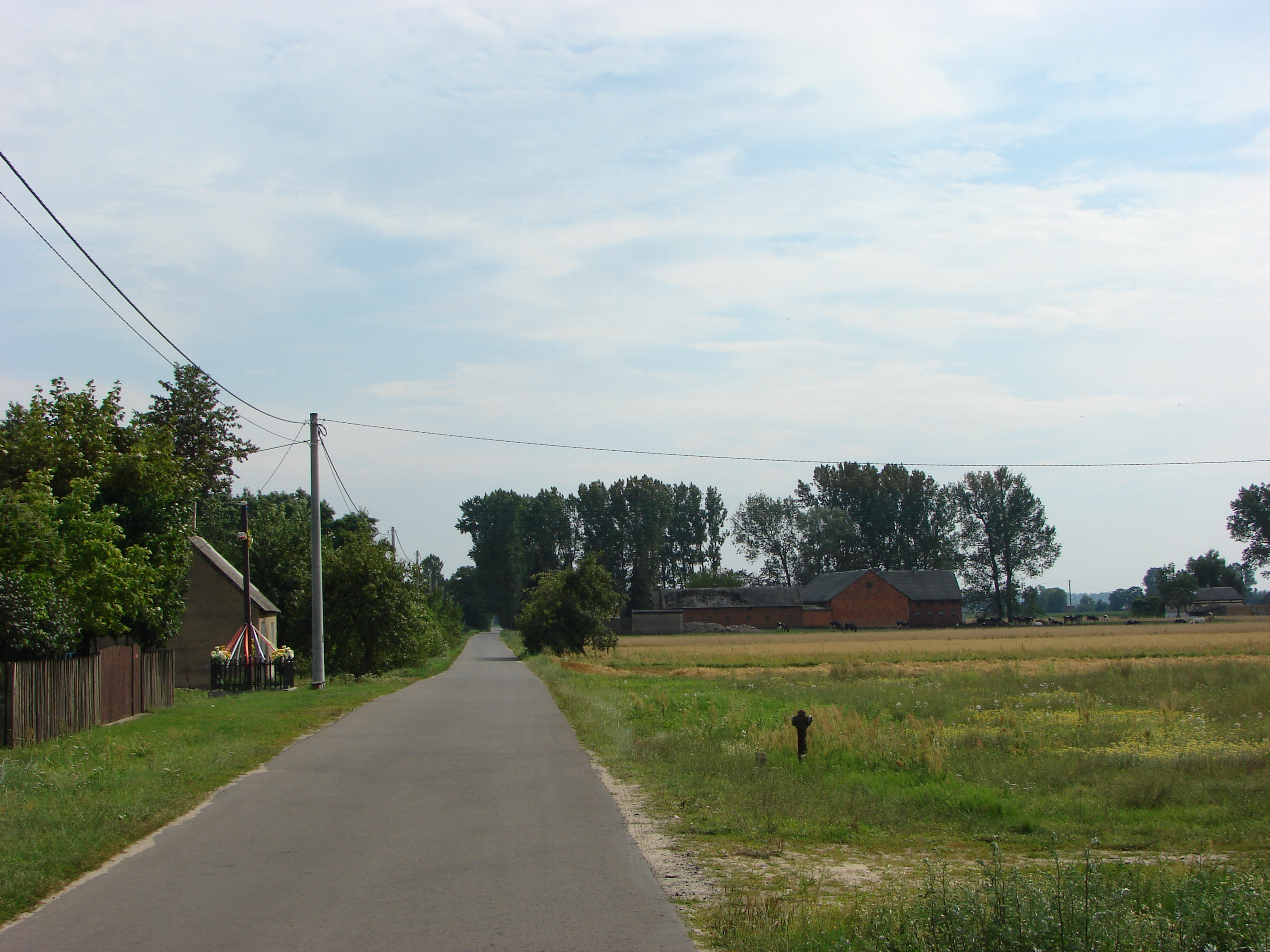
- Road in Goszczędza

- Location within Poland
- Coordinates: 52°06′37″N 18°57′06″E
- Country: Poland
- Voivodeship: Łódź
- County: Łęczyca
- Gmina: Grabów

Goszczędza [ɡɔʂˈt͡ʂɛnd͡za] is a village in the administrative district of Gmina Grabów, within Łęczyca County, Łódź Voivodeship, in central Poland.
