= Agatówka, Kraśnik County =

Agatówka
- Village
- Location within Poland
- Coordinates: 50°50′N 22°04′E
- Country: Poland
- Voivodeship: Lublin
- County: Kraśnik
- Gmina: Trzydnik Duży
- Population: 150

Agatówka [aɡaˈtufka] is a village in the administrative district of Gmina Trzydnik Duży, within Kraśnik County, Lublin Voivodeship, in Eastern Poland.
