= Ksawerów, Łęczyca County =

Ksawerów
- Village
- Location within Poland
- Coordinates: 52°09′54″N 19°01′27″E
- Country: Poland
- Voivodeship: Łódź
- County: Łęczyca
- Gmina: Grabów

Ksawerów [ksaˈvɛruf] is a village in the administrative district of Gmina Grabów, within Łęczyca County, Łódź Voivodeship, in central Poland.
