= Jaworowo =

Jaworowo may refer to the following places:

- Jaworowo, Gniezno County in Greater Poland Voivodeship (west-central Poland)
- Jaworowo, Słupca County in Greater Poland Voivodeship (west-central Poland)
- Jaworowo, Kuyavian-Pomeranian Voivodeship (north-central Poland)

== See also ==
- Jaworów (disambiguation)
