= Rzeczyca Ziemiańska-Kolonia =

- Village
- Location within Poland
- Coordinates: 50°50′59″N 22°11′45″E
- Country: Poland
- Voivodeship: Lublin
- County: Kraśnik
- Gmina: Trzydnik Duży

Rzeczyca Ziemiańska-Kolonia [ʐɛˈt͡ʂɨt͡sa ʑɛˈmjaɲska kɔˈlɔɲa] is a village in the administrative district of Gmina Trzydnik Duży, within Kraśnik County, Lublin Voivodeship, in eastern Poland.
