= Besiekiery =

- Village
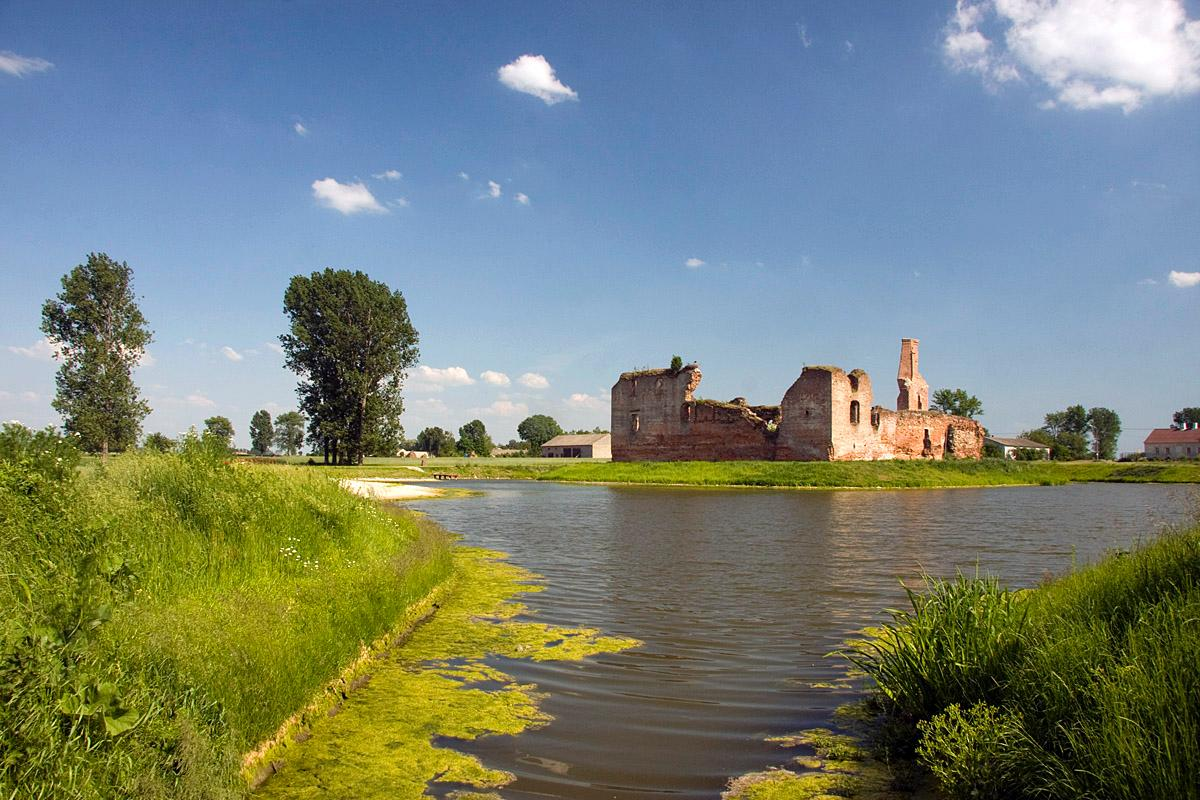
- Castle ruins

- Location within Poland
- Coordinates: 52°9′N 18°58′E
- Country: Poland
- Voivodeship: Łódź
- County: Łęczyca
- Gmina: Grabów

Besiekiery [bɛɕɛˈkʲɛrɨ] is a village in the administrative district of Gmina Grabów, within Łęczyca County, Łódź Voivodeship, in central Poland.

== Sites of interest ==
There is a ruined castle in the village.
