= Bréguet 904 Nymphale =

Two-seat French glider, 1956

Br 904 Nymphale
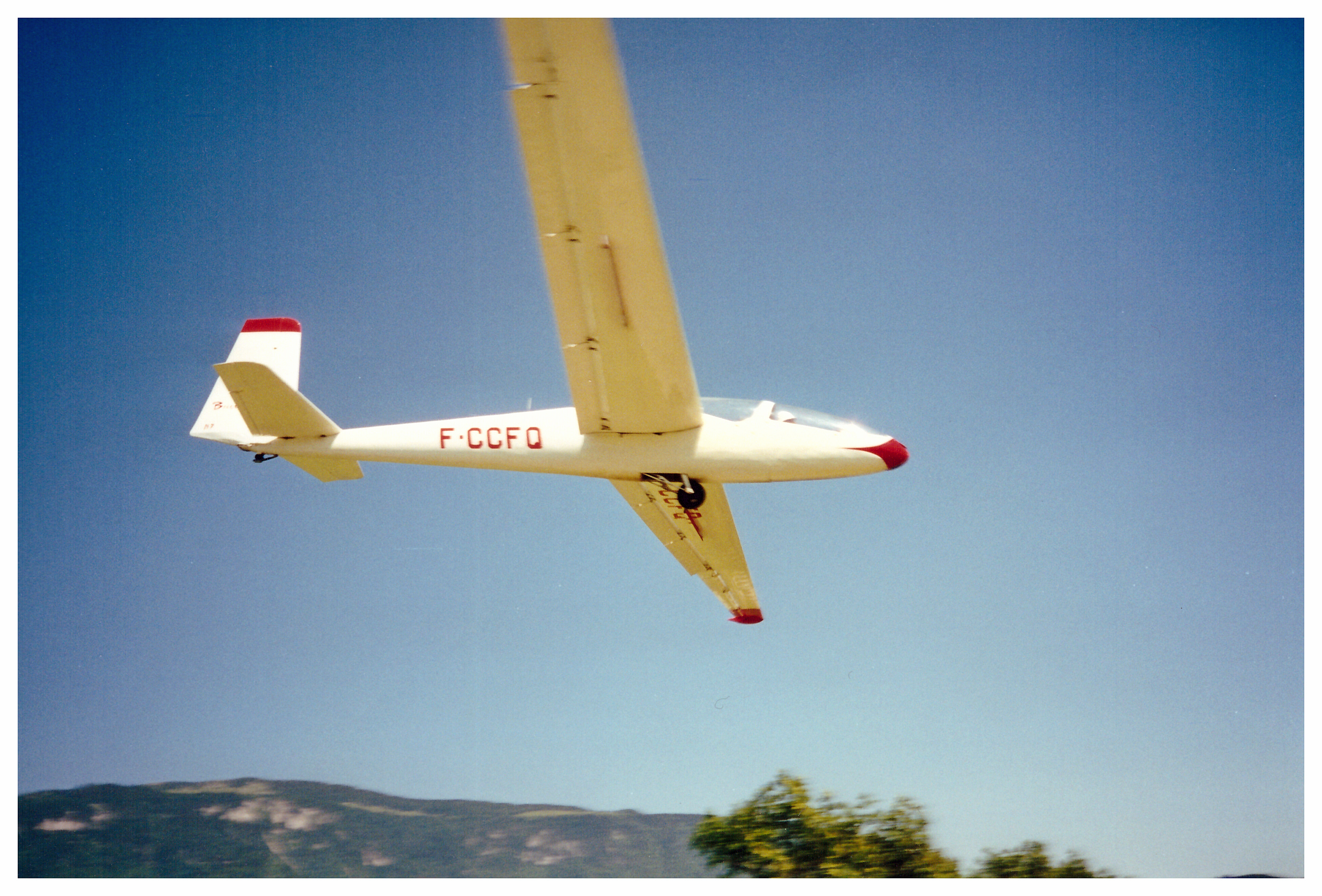

General information
- Type: Two-seat sailplane
- National origin: France
- Manufacturer: Société des Ateliers d'Aviation Louis Bréguet
- Designer: Georges Ricard, Raymond Jarlaud
- Number built: 18

History
- Manufactured: 1956-9
- First flight: 26 May 1956
- Developed from: Breguet Br 901 Mouette

The Bréguet Br 904 Nymphale (English: Nymph) is a two-seat training and competition sailplane, built in France in the 1950s. A direct development of the successful Breguet Br 901 Mouette, it competed at two World Gliding Championships but has mostly been used in small numbers by gliding clubs.

== Design and development ==
The Nymphale is a two-seat development of the double World Gliding Championships (WGC) winning Br 901 Mouette. It is larger all round, with a 2.72 m (8 ft 11 in) increase in span and 1.43 m (4 ft 8 in) longer, but is built of wood and fabric like the single-seater. Behind the wings the 904 and the 901 S1 - the two seater has the more angular fin and rudder of the later 801s - are very much alike in appearance, with a tapering fuselage and conventional empennage. The mid mounted wings, though straight-tapered like those of the 901, differ in having no sweep on the leading edge so that at mid-chord the wing is forward-swept. The cockpit, necessarily lengthened, has the same style of fuselage contour following canopy as the 901 but is divided into front and rear sections, the latter stretching back over the wing leading edge.

The Nymphale made its first flight on 26 May 1956; two more prototypes followed.

== Operational history ==
Fifteen production series 904S Nymphales were built in the late 1950s and widely used by gliding clubs. The Nymphale also competed: one placed 5th in the two-seater class of the 1956 WGC held at Saint-Yan in France. Two years later it again competed in the WGC, held at Leźno in Poland, this time in the Open class with one seat empty. With this disadvantage it could gain only 17th place.

In 2010 six complete Nymphales were on the civil registers of European countries, all in France.

== Variants ==
904
Prototypes, three built.
904S
Production series, 15 built.

== Specifications ==
Data from Die Berühmtesten Segelflugzeuge

General characteristics

- Crew: two
- Length: 9.0 m (29 ft 6 in)
- Wingspan: 20.04 m (65 ft 9 in)
- Wing area: 20.0 m^{2} (215 sq ft)
- Aspect ratio: 20
- Airfoil: NACA 63 series
- Empty weight: 340 kg (750 lb)

Performance

- Stall speed: 62 km/h (39 mph, 33 kn)
- Never exceed speed: 220 km/h (140 mph, 120 kn)
- Rough air speed max: 180 km/h (111.8 mph; 97.2 kn)
- Aerotow speed: 150 km/h (93.2 mph; 81.0 kn)
- Maximum glide ratio: 35:1
- Rate of sink: 0.70 m/s (138 ft/min)
- Lift-to-drag: at 70 km/h (43.5 mph; 37.8 kn)
- Wing loading: 34.5 kg/m^{2} (7.1 lb/sq ft)

== Bibliography ==
- Cuny, Jean & Leyvastre, Pierre (1977). Les Avions Breguet (1940/1971). DOCAVIA (in French). Vol. 6. Paris: Editions Larivière. OCLC 440863702.
- Lacaze, Henri (2016). Les avions Louis Breguet Paris [The Aircraft of Louis Breguet, Paris] (in French). Vol. 2: le règne du monoplan. Le Vigen, France. ISBN 978-2-914017-89-3.
