= Dąbrowa, Gmina Trzydnik Duży =

Dąbrowa
- Village
- Location within Poland
- Coordinates: 50°52′N 22°8′E
- Country: Poland
- Voivodeship: Lublin
- County: Kraśnik
- Gmina: Trzydnik Duży
- Population: 430

Dąbrowa [dɔmˈbrɔva] is a village in the administrative district of Gmina Trzydnik Duży, within Kraśnik County, Lublin Voivodeship, in eastern Poland.
