= Stara Sobótka =

- Village
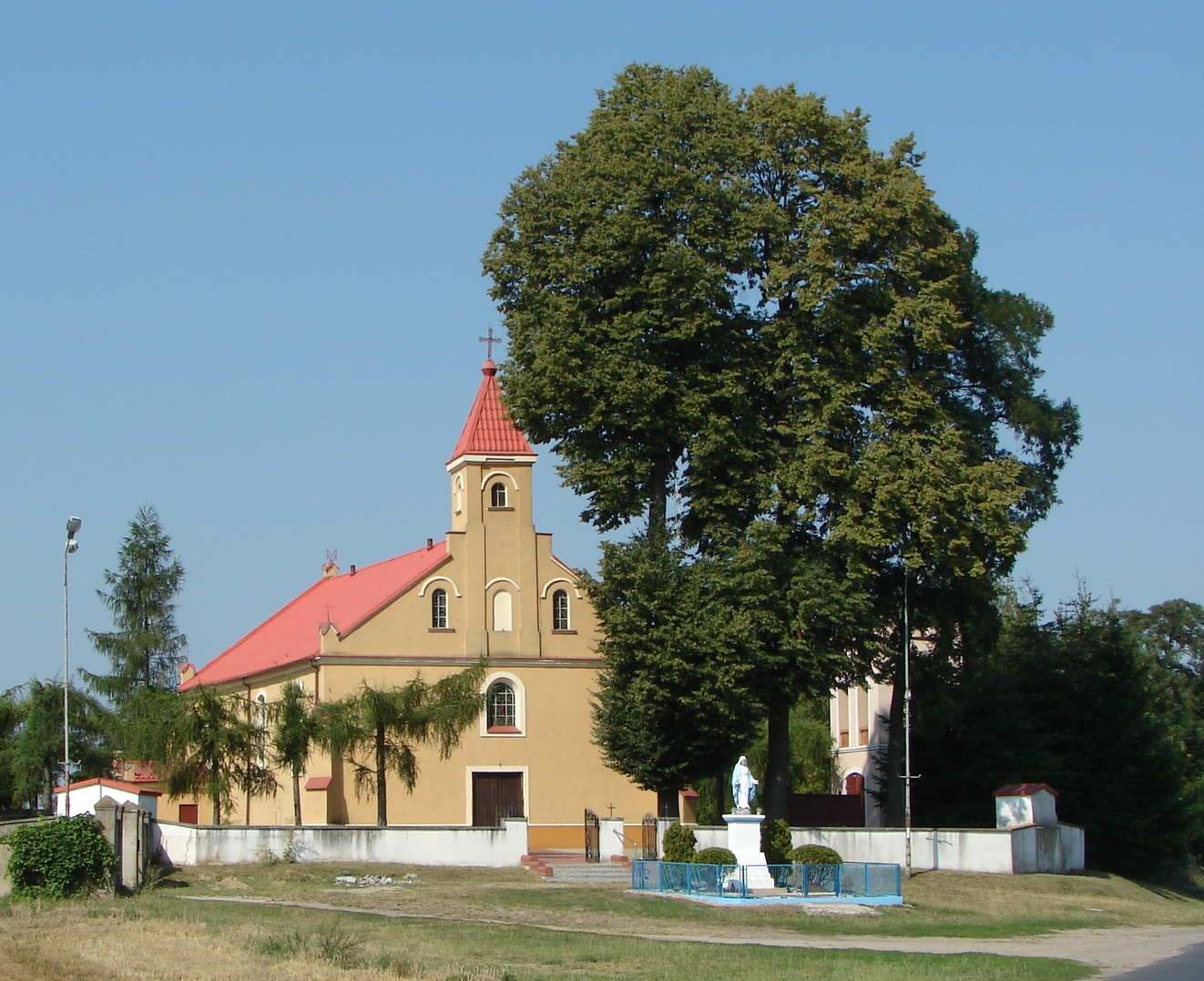
- Church of Saint Matthew from about 1879.

- Location within Poland
- Coordinates: 52°11′11″N 19°1′50″E
- Country: Poland
- Voivodeship: Łódź
- County: Łęczyca
- Gmina: Grabów

Stara Sobótka [ˈstara sɔˈbutka] is a village in the administrative district of Gmina Grabów, within Łęczyca County, Łódź Voivodeship, in central Poland.
