= Rzeczyca Księża =

- Village
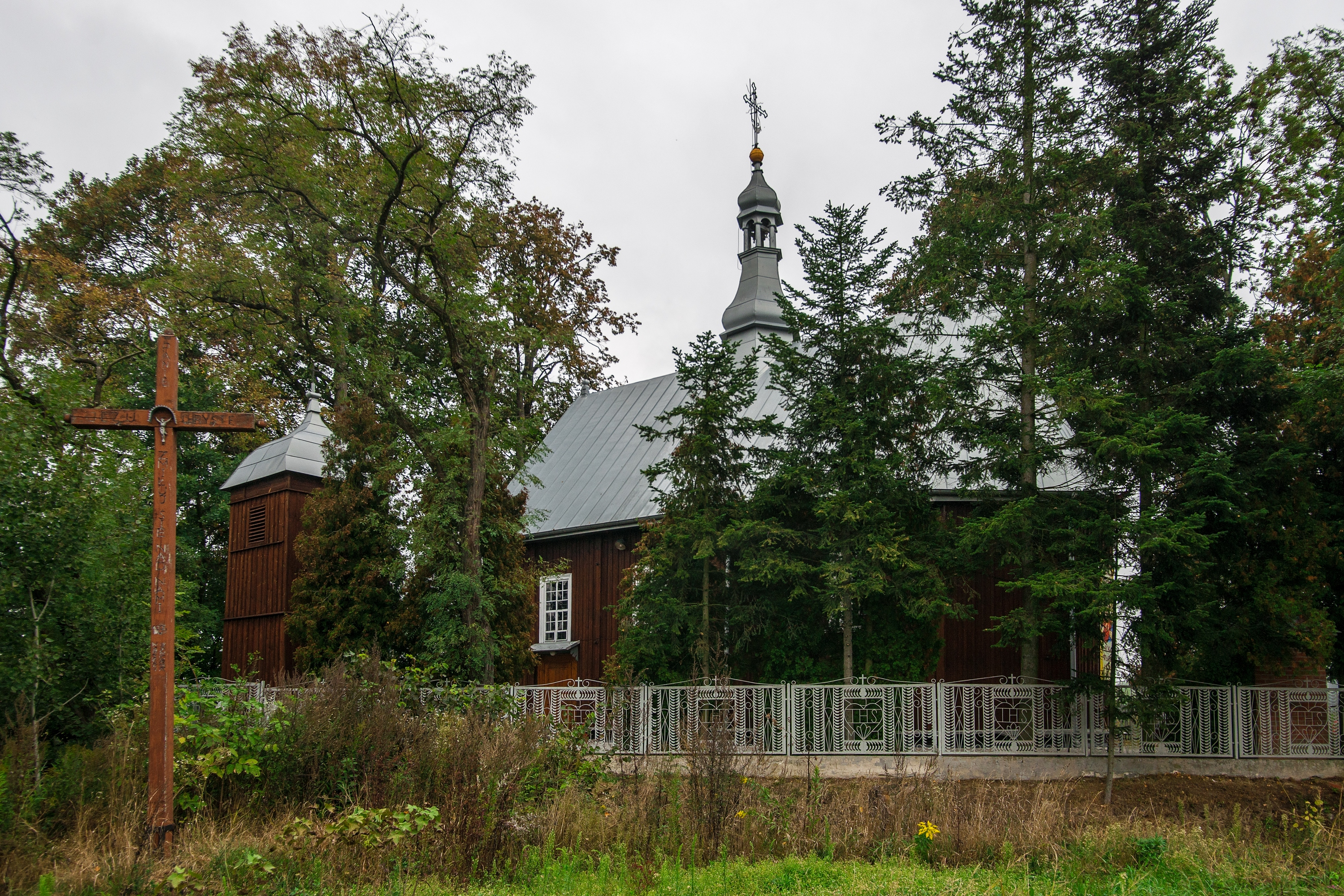
- Holy Cross church in Rzeczyca Księża

- Location within Poland
- Coordinates: 50°52′N 22°13′E
- Country: Poland
- Voivodeship: Lublin
- County: Kraśnik
- Gmina: Trzydnik Duży

Population
  - Total: 830
- Time zone: UTC+1 (CET)
  - Summer (DST): UTC+2 (CEST)

Rzeczyca Księża [ʐɛˈt͡ʂɨt͡sa ˈkɕɛ̃ʐa] is a village in the administrative district of Gmina Trzydnik Duży, within Kraśnik County, Lublin Voivodeship, in eastern Poland.

== History ==
Ten Polish citizens were murdered by Nazi Germany in the village during World War II.
