= Nowa Sobótka =

- Village
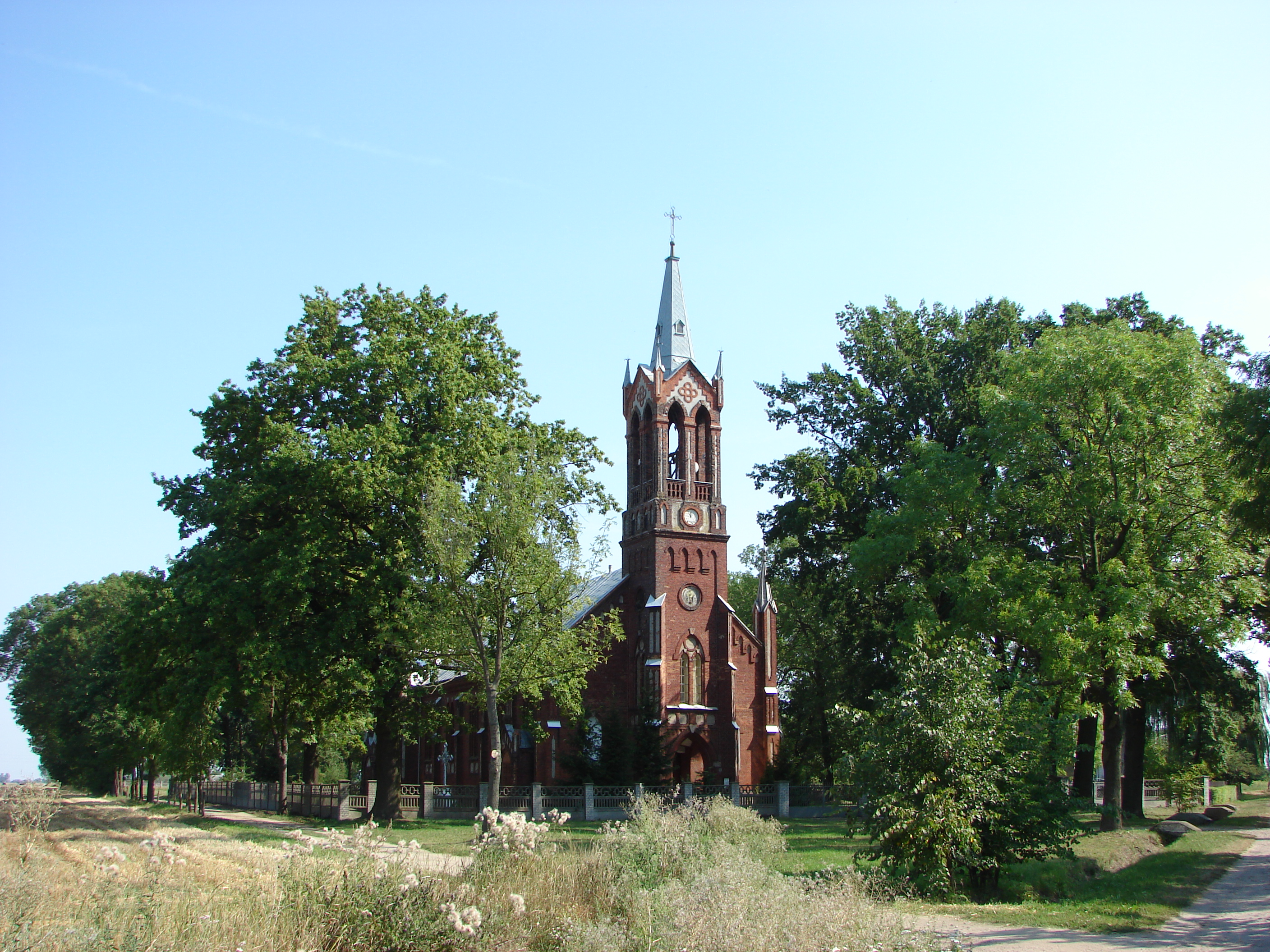
- Mariavite church of Saint Matthew, built about 1908.

- Location within Poland
- Coordinates: 52°11′16″N 19°03′12″E
- Country: Poland
- Voivodeship: Łódź
- County: Łęczyca
- Gmina: Grabów

Nowa Sobótka [ˈnɔva sɔˈbutka] is a village in the administrative district of Gmina Grabów, within Łęczyca County, Łódź Voivodeship, in central Poland.
