= Źrebięta =

- Village
- Location within Poland
- Coordinates: 52°08′46″N 18°56′37″E
- Country: Poland
- Voivodeship: Łódź
- County: Łęczyca
- Gmina: Grabów

Źrebięta [ʑrɛˈbjɛnta] is a village in the administrative district of Gmina Grabów, within Łęczyca County, Łódź Voivodeship, in central Poland.
