= Golbice =

- Village
- Location within Poland
- Coordinates: 52°5′59″N 19°5′19″E
- Country: Poland
- Voivodeship: Łódź
- County: Łęczyca
- Gmina: Grabów
- Population: 160

Golbice [ɡɔlˈbit͡sɛ] is a village in the administrative district of Gmina Grabów, within Łęczyca County, Łódź Voivodeship, in central Poland.
