= Gmina Trzydnik Duży =

Gmina Trzydnik Duży Trzydnik Duży Commune
- Gmina
- Coat of arms
- Interactive map of Gmina Trzydnik Duży
- Coordinates (Trzydnik Duży): 50°52′N 22°8′E
- Country: Poland
- Voivodeship: Lublin
- County: Kraśnik
- Seat: Trzydnik Duży

Area
  - Total: 104.73 km^{2} (40.44 sq mi)

Population (2013)
  - Total: 6,634
  - Density: 63.34/km^{2} (164.1/sq mi)
- Website: http://www.trzydnik.lubelskie.pl

Gmina Trzydnik Duży is a rural gmina (administrative district) in Kraśnik County, Lublin Voivodeship, in eastern Poland. Its seat is the village of Trzydnik Duży, which lies approximately 9 kilometres (6 mi) south-west of Kraśnik and 53 km (33 mi) south-west of the regional capital Lublin.

The gmina covers an area of 104.73 square kilometres (40.4 sq mi), and as of 2006 its total population is 6,947 (6,634 in 2013).

== Villages ==
Gmina Trzydnik Duży contains the villages and settlements of Agatówka, Budki, Dąbrowa, Dębowiec, Liśnik Mały, Łychów Gościeradowski, Łychów Szlachecki, Olbięcin, Owczarnia, Rzeczyca Księża, Rzeczyca Ziemiańska, Rzeczyca Ziemiańska-Kolonia, Trzydnik Duży, Trzydnik Duży-Kolonia, Trzydnik Mały, Węglin, Węglinek, Wola Trzydnicka, Wólka Olbięcka and Zielonka.

== Neighbouring gminas ==
Gmina Trzydnik Duży is bordered by the gminas of Dzierzkowice, Gościeradów, Kraśnik, Potok Wielki, Szastarka and Zaklików.
