= Stary Besk =

- Village

- Location within Poland
- Coordinates: 52°7′N 19°3′E
- Country: Poland
- Voivodeship: Łódź
- County: Łęczyca
- Gmina: Grabów

Stary Besk [ˈstarɨ ˈbɛsk] is a village in the administrative district of Gmina Grabów, within Łęczyca County, Łódź Voivodeship, in central Poland.
