= Chorki (village) =

- Village
- Location within Poland
- Coordinates: 52°6′N 19°4′E
- Country: Poland
- Voivodeship: Łódź
- County: Łęczyca
- Gmina: Grabów
- Population: 200
- Time zone: UTC+1 (CET)
  - Summer (DST): UTC+2 (CEST)
- ISO 3166 code: POL

Chorki [ˈxɔrki] is a village in the administrative district of Gmina Grabów, within Łęczyca County, Łódź Voivodeship, in central Poland.
