= Łychów Gościeradowski =

- Village
- Location within Poland
- Coordinates: 50°50′N 22°9′E
- Country: Poland
- Voivodeship: Lublin
- County: Kraśnik
- Gmina: Trzydnik Duży

Łychów Gościeradowski (Polish pronunciation: [ˈwɨxuv ɡɔɕt͡ɕɛraˈdɔfskʲi]) is a village in the administrative district of Gmina Trzydnik Duży, within Kraśnik County, Lublin Voivodeship, in eastern Poland.
