= Kadzidłowa =

- Village
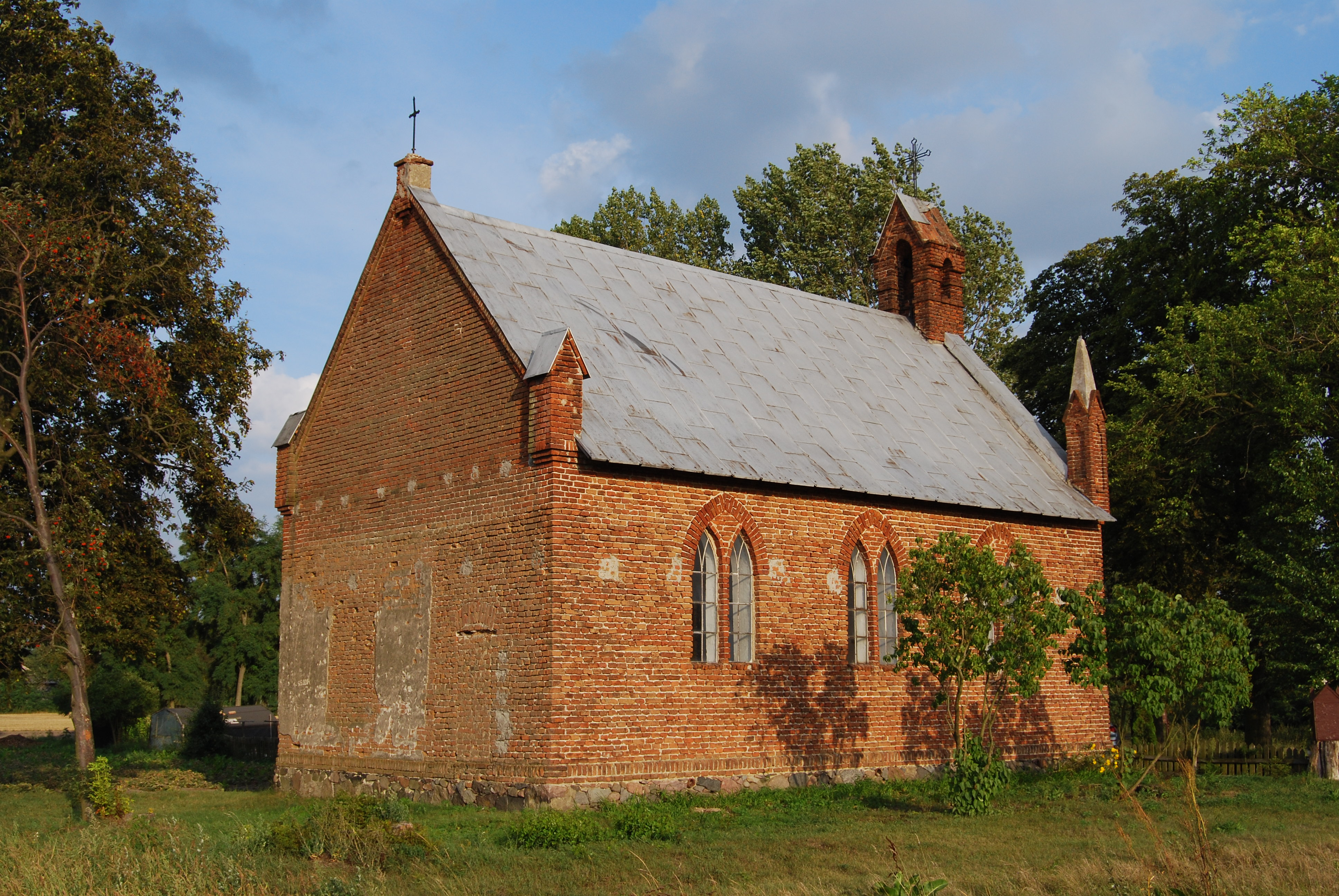
- Catholic church

- Location within Poland
- Coordinates: 52°11′N 18°56′E
- Country: Poland
- Voivodeship: Łódź
- County: Łęczyca
- Gmina: Grabów
- Website: http://www.kadzidlowa.republika.pl/

Kadzidłowa [kad͡ʑiˈdwɔva] is a village in the administrative district of Gmina Grabów, within Łęczyca County, Łódź Voivodeship, in central Poland.
