= Byszew, Łęczyca County =

Byszew
- Village
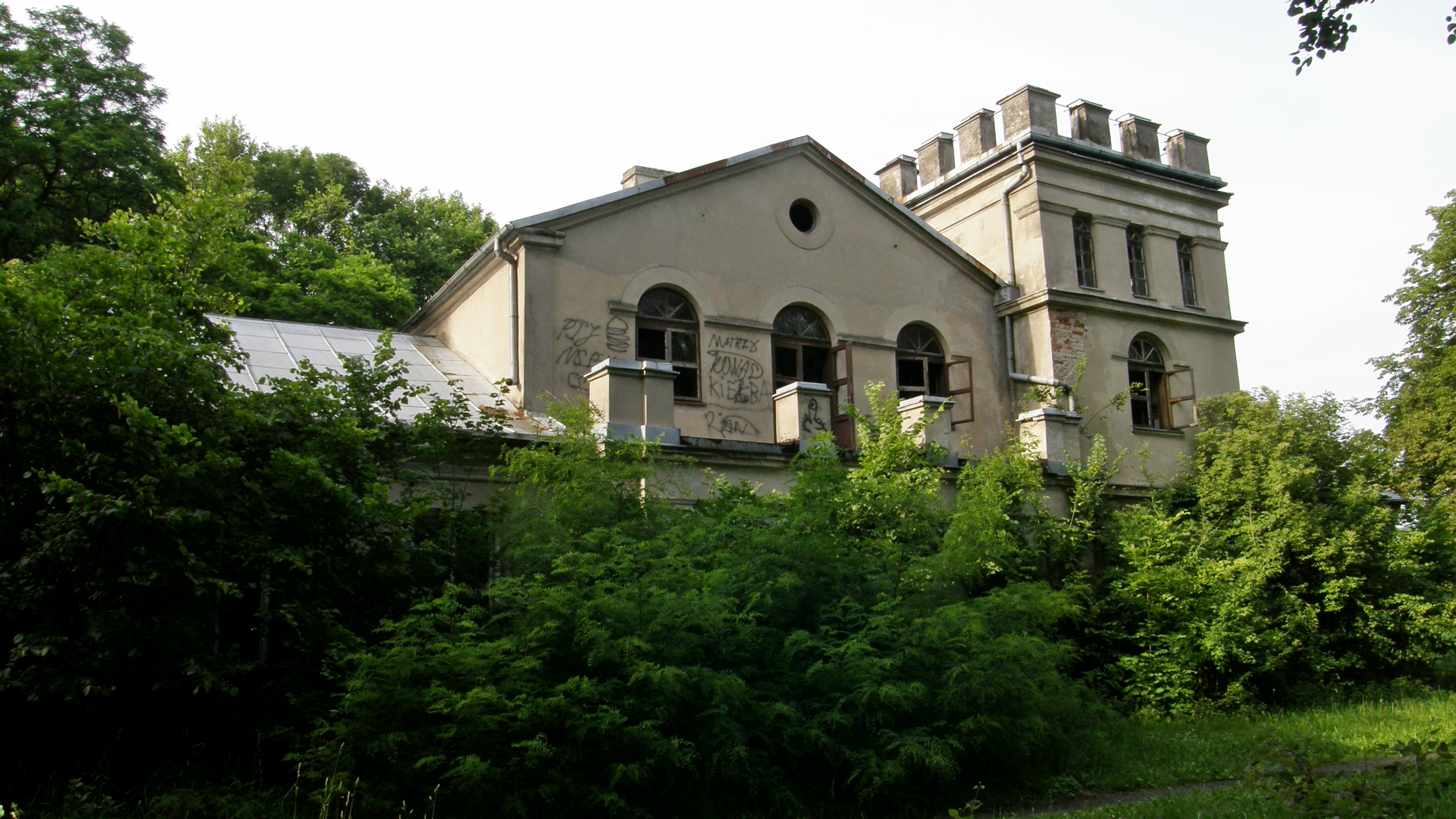
- Manor house

- Location within Poland
- Coordinates: 52°6′28″N 18°58′24″E
- Country: Poland
- Voivodeship: Łódź
- County: Łęczyca
- Gmina: Grabów
- Population: 240

Byszew [ˈbɨʂɛf] is a village in the administrative district of Gmina Grabów, within Łęczyca County, Łódź Voivodeship, in central Poland.
