= Rzeczyca Ziemiańska =

- Village
- Location within Poland
- Coordinates: 50°51′N 22°11′E
- Country: Poland
- Voivodeship: Lublin
- County: Kraśnik
- Gmina: Trzydnik Duży
- Population: 1,000

Rzeczyca Ziemiańska [ʐɛˈt͡ʂɨt͡sa ʑɛˈmjaɲska] is a village in the administrative district of Gmina Trzydnik Duży, within Kraśnik County, Lublin Voivodeship, in eastern Poland.

== Notable residents ==
- Maria Hempel (1834–1904), ethnobotanist; buried in the village cemetery.
