= Wygorzele, Łódź Voivodeship =

Wygorzele
- Village
- Location within Poland
- Coordinates: 52°12′N 19°3′E
- Country: Poland
- Voivodeship: Łódź
- County: Łęczyca
- Gmina: Grabów

Wygorzele [vɨɡɔˈʐɛlɛ] (German Rönneberg) is a village in the administrative district of Gmina Grabów, within Łęczyca County, Łódź Voivodeship, in central Poland.
