= Łychów Szlachecki =

- Village
- Location within Poland
- Coordinates: 50°49′N 22°9′E
- Country: Poland
- Voivodeship: Lublin
- County: Kraśnik
- Gmina: Trzydnik Duży

Łychów Szlachecki (Polish pronunciation: [ˈwɨxuf ʂlaˈxɛtskʲi]) is a village in the administrative district of Gmina Trzydnik Duży, within Kraśnik County, Lublin Voivodeship, in eastern Poland.
