= Dębowiec, Kraśnik County =

Dębowiec
- Village
- Location within Poland
- Coordinates: 50°54′N 22°8′E
- Country: Poland
- Voivodeship: Lublin
- County: Kraśnik
- Gmina: Trzydnik Duży

Dębowiec [dɛmˈbɔvjɛt͡s] is a village in the administrative district of Gmina Trzydnik Duży, within Kraśnik County, Lublin Voivodeship, in eastern Poland.
