= Borów, Gmina Grabów =

Borów
- Village
- Location within Poland
- Coordinates: 52°06′28″N 19°04′26.7″E
- Country: Poland
- Voivodeship: Łódź
- County: Łęczyca
- Gmina: Grabów

Borów [ˈbɔruf] is a village in the administrative district of Gmina Grabów, within Łęczyca County, Łódź Voivodeship, in central Poland.
