= Oskar Kolberg =

Polish ethnographer, folklorist and composer

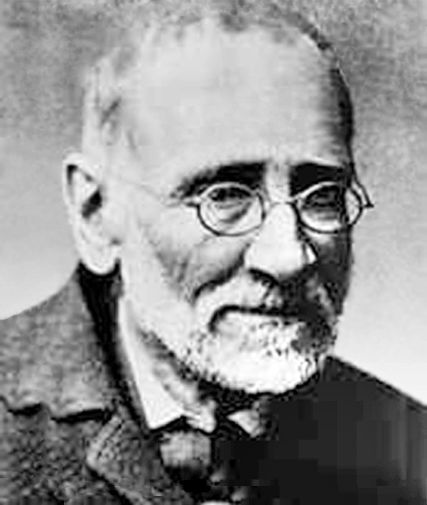
- Henryk Oskar Kolberg
- Born: 22 February 1814; Przysucha, Duchy of Warsaw
- Died: 3 June 1890 (aged 76); Kraków, Poland under Partitions
- Occupations: Historian, ethnographer
- Writing career
- Language: Polish
- Genres: Ethnography, history, personal correspondence
- Notable work: Pieśni ludu polskiego (1900-03)
- Literary movement: Modernism

Henryk Oskar Kolberg (22 February 1814 – 3 June 1890) was a Polish ethnographer, folklorist, and composer active in Partitioned Poland.

== Life ==
Kolberg was born in Przysucha, the son of the German Julius(z) Kolberg, a professor of the Warsaw University, and Fryderyka née Mercoeur, Warsaw-born while being of French descendance. His family's acquaintances included Samuel Linde, Nicolas (Mikołaj) Chopin (father of Frédéric Chopin), and Kazimierz Brodziński.

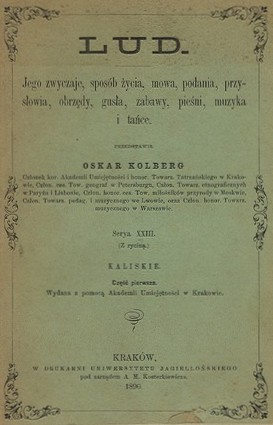
Volume XXIII "Kaliskie", 1890

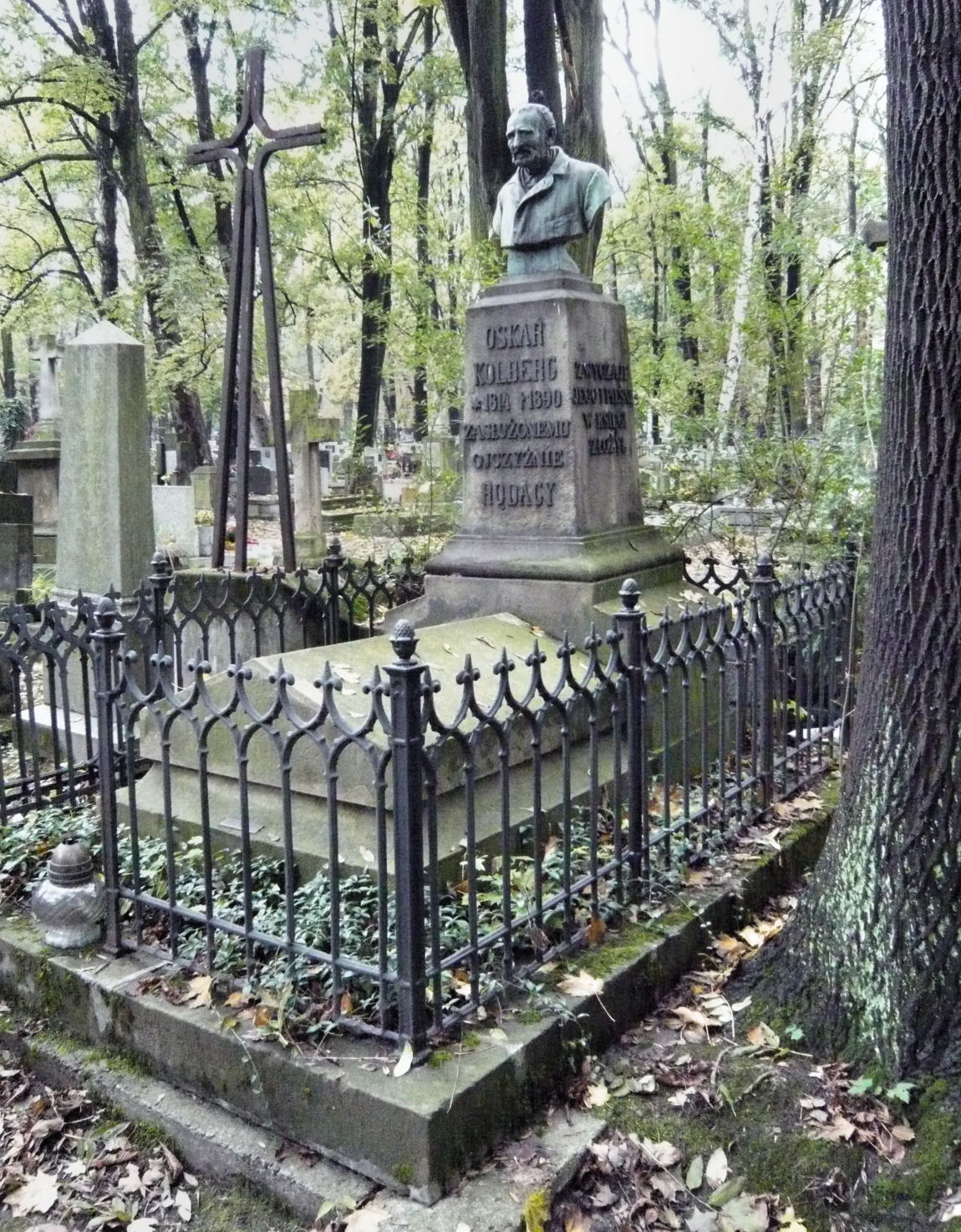
Grave of Oskar Kolberg at the Rakowicki Cemetery in Kraków

He is best known for his work titled Lud (re-published as Dzieła Wszystkie), a compilation of folk traditions from all the Polish regions. Between 1857–1890 he published 33 volumes, and after his death, a further 3 volumes were published. The compilation contains 12,000 folk songs, 1,250 folk tales, 670 fairy tales, 2,700 proverbs, 350 riddles, 15 folk spectacles and many other ethnographic documents. Ethnobotanist Maria Hempel supported Kolberg with his study of the Chełm region.

Kolberg also compiled some ethnographic information on neighboring regions. He died in Kraków.

== Works ==
- Pieśni ludu polskiego (Songs of Polish Folklore) - vol. 1 (Supplement vol. 70)

- Sandomierskie - vol. 2 (Supplement vol. 71)
- Kujawy - vol. 3, 4 (Supplement in vol. 72)
- Krakowskie – vol. 5 – 8 (Supplement part I in Vol. 73)
- Poznańskie - vol. 9 – 15 (Supplement vol. 74)
- Lubelskie - vol. 16, 17 (Supplement vol. 75)
- Kieleckie – vol. 18, 19 (Supplement vol. 76)
- Radomskie – vol. 20, 21 (Supplement part I of vol. 77)
- Łęczyckie - vol. 22 (Supplement vol. 78)
- Kaliskie - vol. 23 (Supplement vol. 79)
- Mazowsze – vol. 24–28, 41-42 (Supplement vol. 80)
- Pokucie – vol. 29–33 (Supplement vol. 81)
- Chełmskie - part II of vol. 34 (Supplement vol. 82)
- Przemyskie - vol. 35 (Supplement vol. 83)
- Wołyń - vol. 36 (Supplement vol. 84)
- Miscellanea - vol. 37 - 38
- Pomorze - vol. 39
- Mazury Pruskie - vol. 40
- Śląsk - vol. 43
- Góry i Podgórze - vol. 44, 45
- Kaliskie i Sieradzkie - vol. 46
- Podole - vol. 47
- Tarnowskie-Rzeszowskie - vol. 48
- Sanockie-Krośnieńskie - vol. 49-51
- Białoruś-Polesie - vol. 52
- Litwa - vol. 53
- Ruś Karpacka - vol. 54, 55
- Ruś Czerwona - vol. 56, 57
- Materiały do etnografii Słowian wschodnich - vol. 58
- Materiały do etnografii Słowian zachodnich i południowych cz.I Łużyce - vol. 59/I
- Materiały do etnografii Słowian zachodnich i południowych cz.II Czechy, Słowacja - vol. 59/II
- Materiały do etnografii Słowian zachodnich i południowych cz.III Słowiańszczyzna południowa - vol. 59/III
- Przysłowia - vol. 60
- Pisma muzyczne - vol. 61-62
- Studia, rozprawy i artykuły - vol. 63
- Korespondencja Oskara Kolberga - vol. 64-66
- Pieśni i melodie ludowe w opracowaniu fortepianowym - vol. 67
- Kompozycje wokalno-instrumentalne - vol. 68
- Kompozycje fortepianowe - vol. 69
- Biografia Oskara Kolberga - vol. 85
- Indeksy - vol. 86

== See also ==
- List of Poles (Social sciences)
