= Bowętów =

Village in Gmina Grabów, Poland

- Village
- Location within Poland
- Coordinates: 52°08′01″N 19°02′24″E
- Country: Poland
- Voivodeship: Łódź
- County: Łęczyca
- Gmina: Grabów

Bowętów [bɔˈvɛntuf] is a village in the administrative district of Gmina Grabów, within Łęczyca County, Łódź Voivodeship, in central Poland.
