= Węglinek, Kraśnik County =

Węglinek
- Village
- Location within Poland
- Coordinates: 50°49′13″N 22°06′53″E
- Country: Poland
- Voivodeship: Lublin
- County: Kraśnik
- Gmina: Trzydnik Duży

Węglinek [vɛŋˈɡlinɛk] is a village in the administrative district of Gmina Trzydnik Duży, within Kraśnik County, Lublin Voivodeship, in eastern Poland.
