= Pieczew =

- Village
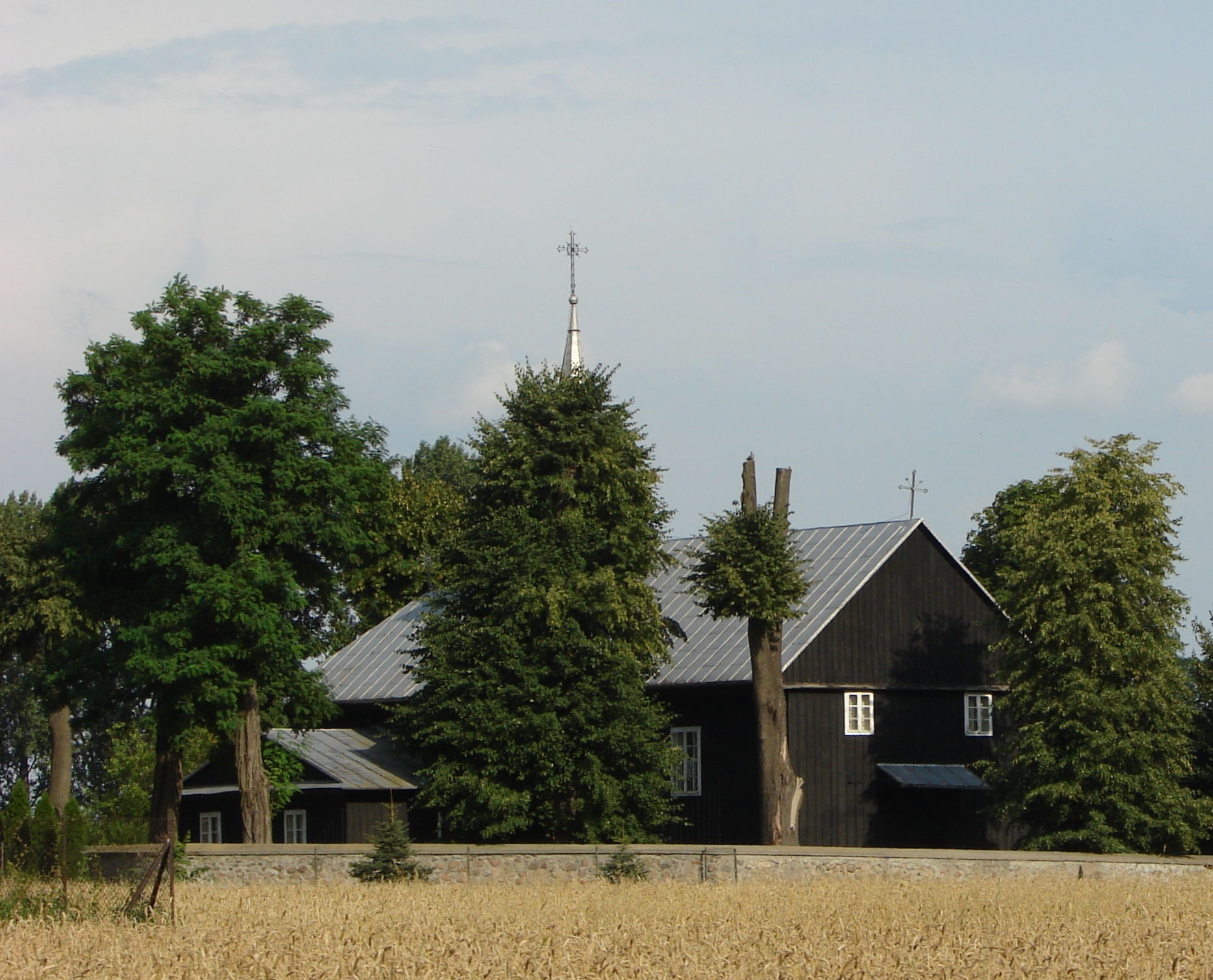
- Parish church of Saint Stanislaus, built 1747.

- Location within Poland
- Coordinates: 52°8′N 18°56′E
- Country: Poland
- Voivodeship: Łódź
- County: Łęczyca
- Gmina: Grabów

Pieczew [ˈpjɛt͡ʂɛf] is a village in the administrative district of Gmina Grabów, within Łęczyca County, Łódź Voivodeship, in central Poland.
