= Trzydnik Duży-Kolonia =

- Village
- Location within Poland
- Coordinates: 50°51′45″N 22°08′09″E
- Country: Poland
- Voivodeship: Lublin
- County: Kraśnik
- Gmina: Trzydnik Duży

Trzydnik Duży-Kolonia [ˈtʂɨdnik ˈduʐɨ kɔˈlɔɲa] is a village in the administrative district of Gmina Trzydnik Duży, within Kraśnik County, Lublin Voivodeship, in eastern Poland.
