= Besiekiery Castle =

Coordinates: 52°09′11″N 18°57′54″E

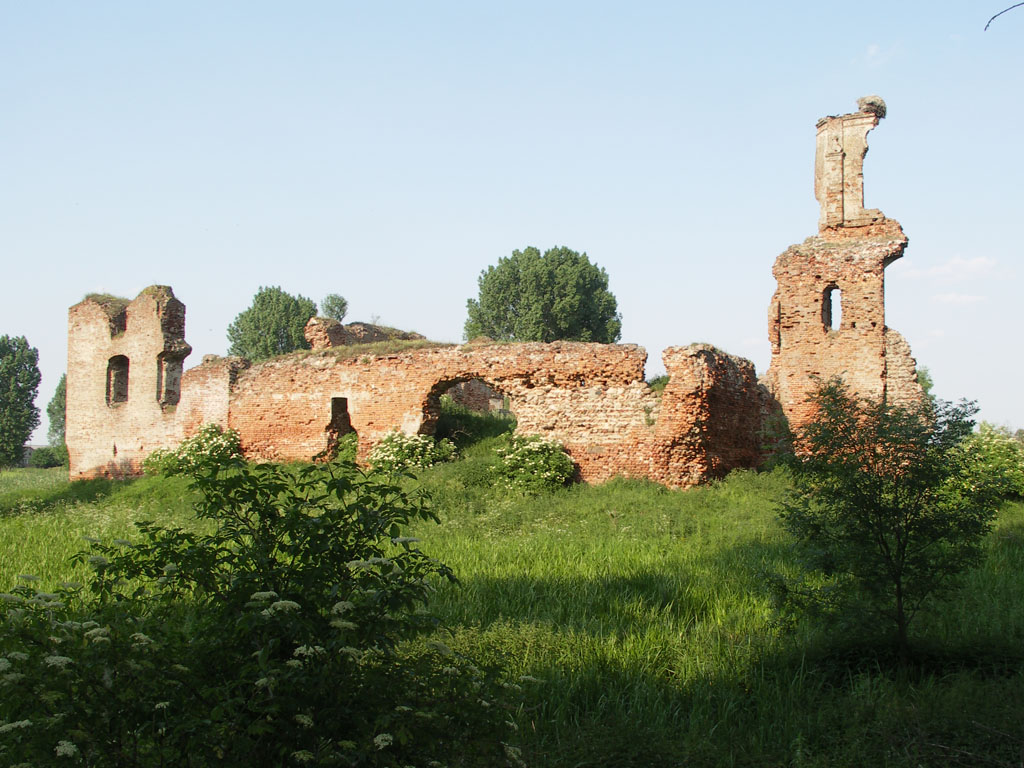
Ruins of the Besiekiery Castle

Besiekiery Castle (Polish: Zamek w besiekierach) is a castle in the Polish village of Besiekiery. It was built by the Łęczyca voivod Lawrence Sokolowski at the end of the 15th century. The knights' headquarters had a tower and was surrounded by a moat, the remains of which are visible today.

== History ==
In the year 1597, Cardinal Andrzej Batory rebuilt the castle. The next renovation came after flood damage caused by the invading Swedes, was undertaken by Łęczycka Starosta Jan Szczawiński in 1655. His coat of arms "Prawdzic" is still visible on the cartouche. In the 18th century the castle was owned by "Gajewskich" who lowered its residential building by one floor.

Built of brick on a rectangular plan the castle had a drawbridge leading to the most forward section of the wall outside the south peripheral gate tower.

After 1800 the castle was never inhabited again, and slowly fell into disrepair.

Large portions of the ruins survived. Entrance to the ruins is free of charge. The ruins are very easy to find as they are visible from the road. Reaching the ruins requires crossing the moat and then climbing up the hill.

The origin of the castle in Besiekiery is unclear. According to some research the castle was built in 1500 by the provincial governor of Łęczyca, Mikołak Sokołowski. However, no document confirms this. Another hypothesis attributes the erection of the stronghold to esquire carver of Brzeski, Wojaciech Sokołowski as a builder of the castle. Thus, it might be assumed that the building was erected by Sokołowski at the turn of the 15th and 16th century.

Later history of the monument is now better recorded. It is known that at the end of the 16th century the castle belonged to Andrzej Batory, and after that it changed hands often. Unfortunately the foundation did not survive well. In the 17th century it began to deteriorate and its existence was ended in a fire in 1731. The then owners, the Gajewskis, disassembled the second storey, and in the middle of the 19th century the castle carried out only economic functions.

== See also ==
- Castles in Poland
