= Nagórki, Łódź Voivodeship =

Nagórki
- Village
- Location within Poland
- Coordinates: 52°5′41″N 19°0′23″E
- Country: Poland
- Voivodeship: Łódź
- County: Łęczyca
- Gmina: Grabów

Nagórki [naˈɡurki] is a village in the administrative district of Gmina Grabów, within Łęczyca County, Łódź Voivodeship, in central Poland.
