= Gać, Łódź Voivodeship =

Gać
- Village
- Location within Poland
- Coordinates: 52°05′43″N 19°03′17″E
- Country: Poland
- Voivodeship: Łódź
- County: Łęczyca
- Gmina: Grabów

Gać (Polish pronunciation: [ɡat͡ɕ]) is a village in the administrative district of Gmina Grabów, within Łęczyca County, Łódź Voivodeship, in central Poland.
