= Kotków, Łęczyca County =

Kotków
- Village
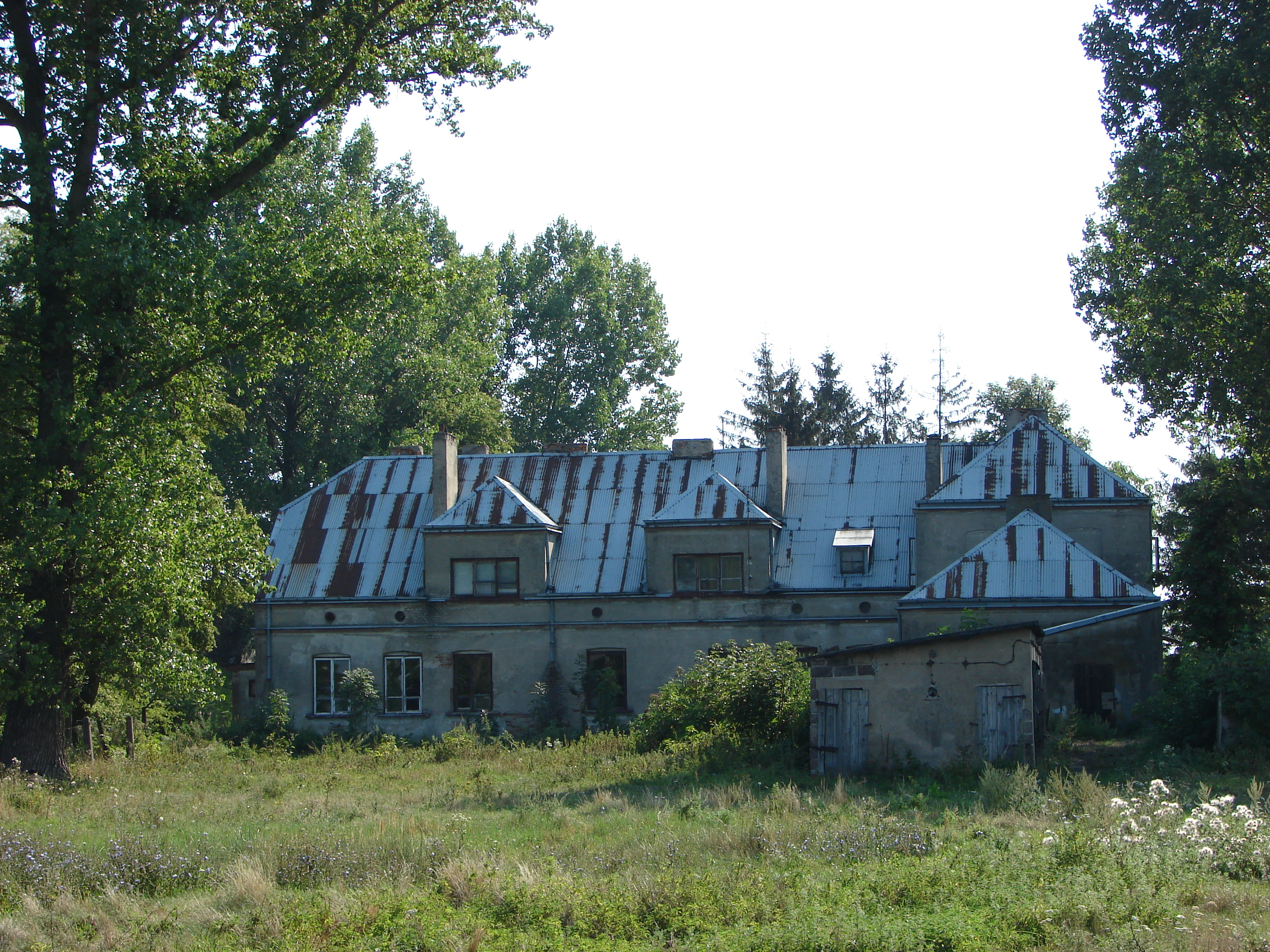
- Manor

- Location within Poland
- Coordinates: 52°13′N 19°2′E
- Country: Poland
- Voivodeship: Łódź
- County: Łęczyca
- Gmina: Grabów

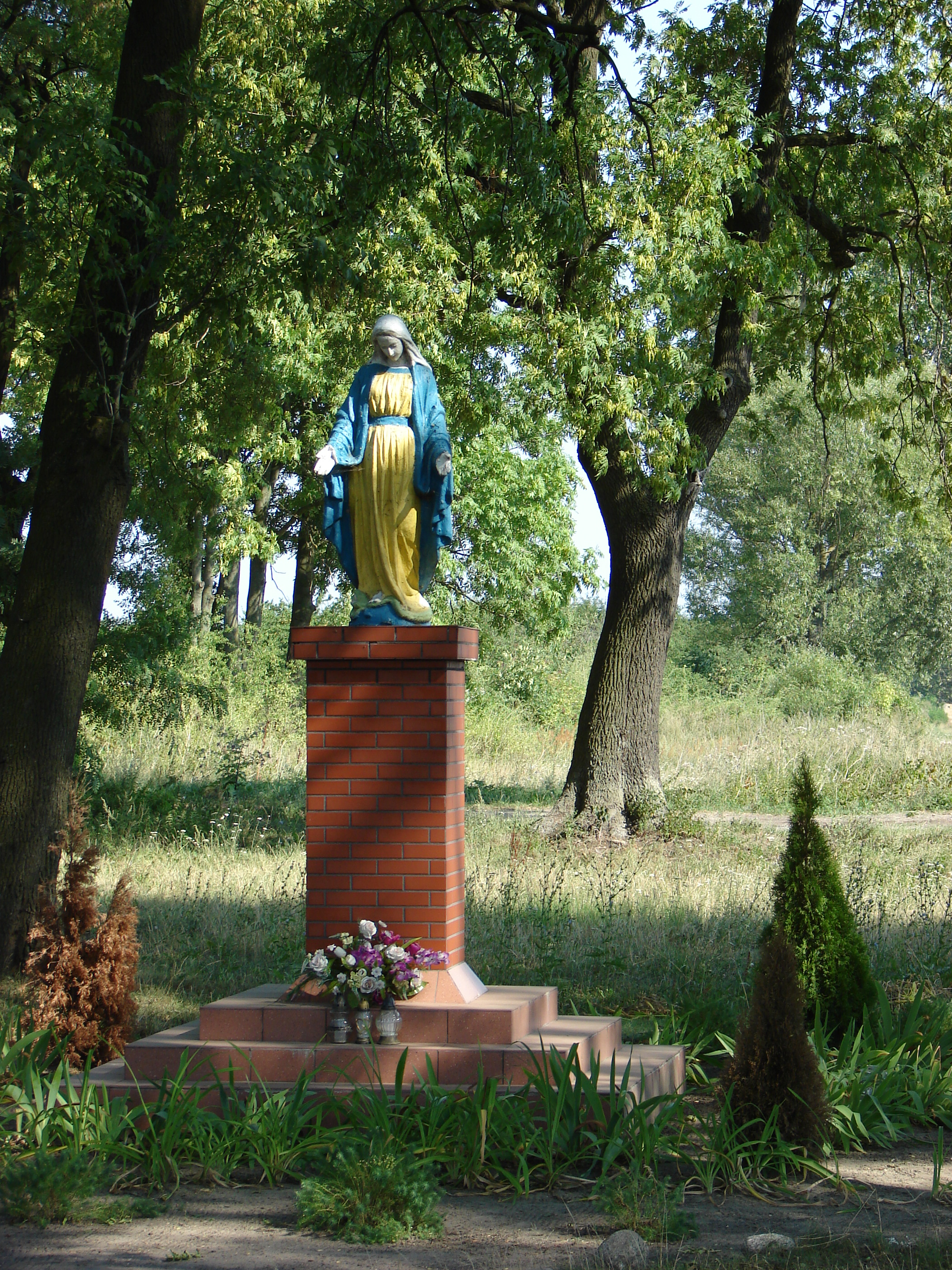
Figure of Virgin Mary

Kotków [ˈkɔtkuf] is a village in the administrative district of Gmina Grabów, within Łęczyca County, Łódź Voivodeship, in central Poland.
