= Smardzew, Łęczyca County =

Smardzew
- Village
- Location within Poland
- Coordinates: 52°10′N 18°56′E
- Country: Poland
- Voivodeship: Łódź
- County: Łęczyca
- Gmina: Grabów

Smardzew [ˈsmard͡zɛf] is a village in the administrative district of Gmina Grabów, within Łęczyca County, Łódź Voivodeship, in central Poland.
