= Srebrna, Łódź Voivodeship =

Srebrna
- Village
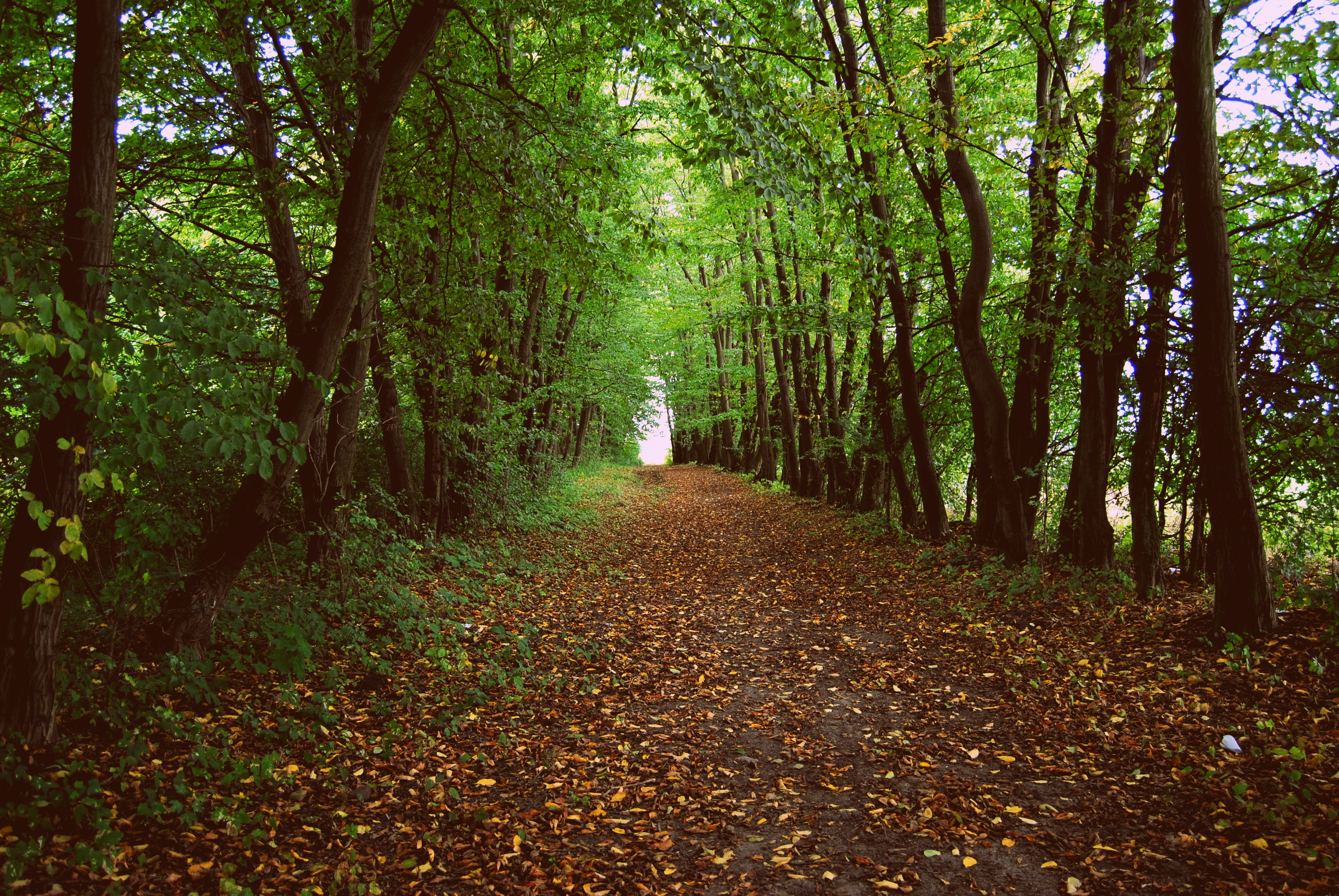
- Park

- Location within Poland
- Coordinates: 52°10′12″N 19°0′7″E
- Country: Poland
- Voivodeship: Łódź
- County: Łęczyca
- Gmina: Grabów
- Population: 180

Srebrna [ˈsrɛbrna] is a village in the administrative district of Gmina Grabów, within Łęczyca County, Łódź Voivodeship, in central Poland.
