= Budki, Kraśnik County =

Budki
- Village
- Location within Poland
- Coordinates: 50°51′39″N 22°6′12″E
- Country: Poland
- Voivodeship: Lublin
- County: Kraśnik
- Gmina: Trzydnik Duży
- Time zone: UTC+1 (CET)
  - Summer (DST): UTC+2 (CEST)

Budki [ˈbutki] is a village in the administrative district of Gmina Trzydnik Duży, within Kraśnik County, Lublin Voivodeship, in eastern Poland.

== History ==
Three Polish citizens were murdered by Nazi Germany in the village during World War II.
