= Kim Kak =

Korean military officer (1536–1610)

- Hangul: 김각
- Hanja: 金覺
- RR: Gim Gak
- MR: Kim Kak

Art name
- Hangul: 석천
- Hanja: 石川
- RR: Seokcheon
- MR: Sŏkch'ŏn

Courtesy name
- Hangul: 경성
- Hanja: 景惺
- RR: Gyeongseong
- MR: Kyŏngsŏng

Kim Kak (Korean: 김각; Hanja: 金覺; 1536–1610) was a Korean military officer and poet during the Choseon Dynasty. He was born in Sangju.

The poet's life was influenced by the Japanese invasion of 1592. His poetic work is characterized by Confucian ethics and the joy of living.
