= Piotrkówek, Łódź Voivodeship =

Piotrkówek
- Village
- Location within Poland
- Coordinates: 52°11′40″N 18°57′09″E
- Country: Poland
- Voivodeship: Łódź
- County: Łęczyca
- Gmina: Grabów

Piotrkówek [pjɔtrˈkuvɛk] is a village in the administrative district of Gmina Grabów, within Łęczyca County, Łódź Voivodeship, in central Poland.
