= Leszno, Łęczyca County =

Leszno
- Village
- Location within Poland
- Coordinates: 52°05′20″N 18°56′48″E
- Country: Poland
- Voivodeship: Łódź
- County: Łęczyca
- Gmina: Grabów
- Time zone: UTC+1 (CET)
  - Summer (DST): UTC+2 (CEST)
- Vehicle registration: ELE

Leszno [ˈlɛʂnɔ] is a village in the administrative district of Gmina Grabów, within Łęczyca County, Łódź Voivodeship, in central Poland.

== History ==
In the late 19th century, the village had a population of 149.

During the German occupation of Poland (World War II), in 1940, the German gendarmerie carried out expulsions of Poles, whose houses and farms were then handed over to German colonists as part of the Lebensraum policy.
