= Jastrzębia, Łęczyca County =

Jastrzębia
- Village
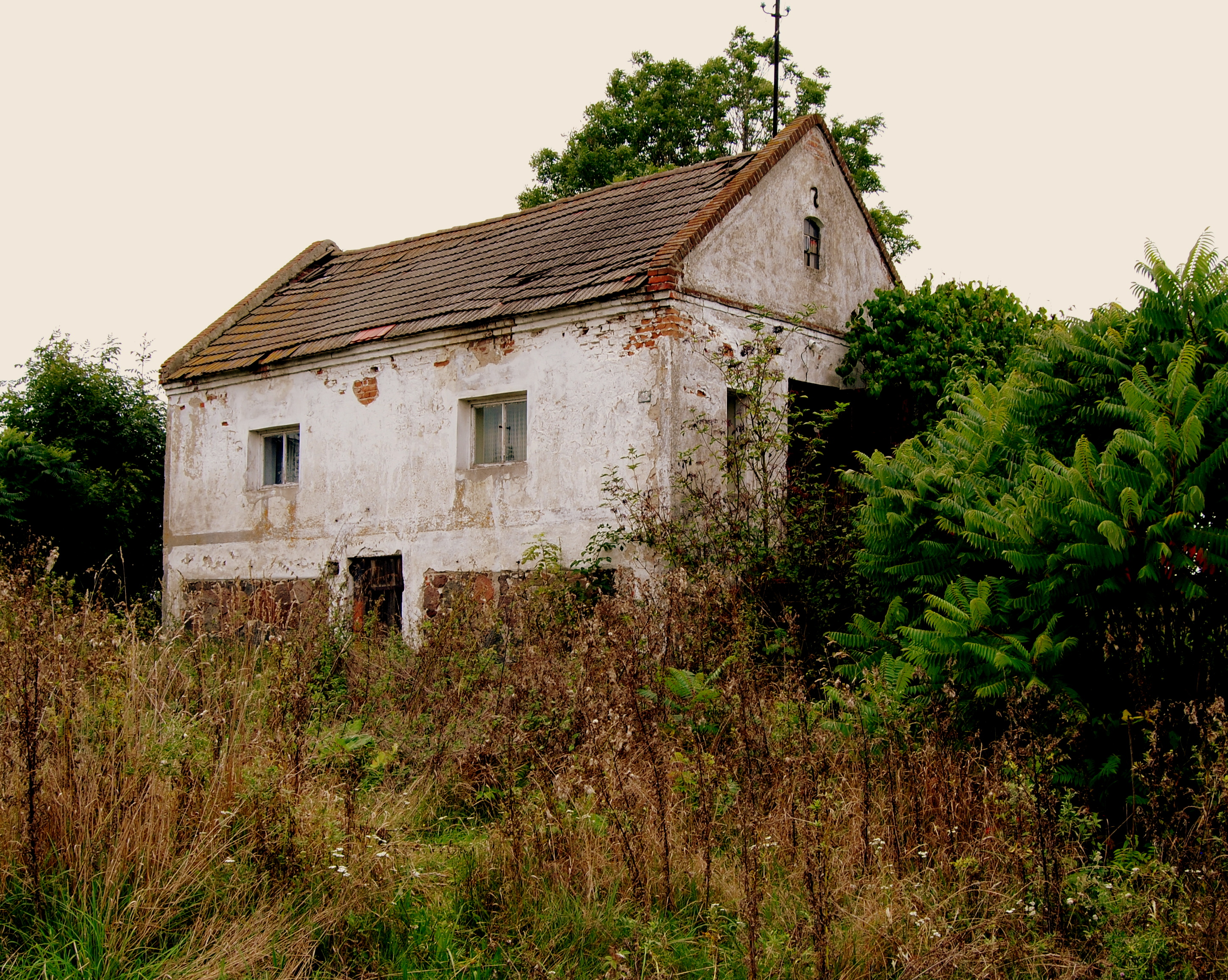
- Granary

- Location within Poland
- Coordinates: 52°10′28″N 18°59′9″E
- Country: Poland
- Voivodeship: Łódź
- County: Łęczyca
- Gmina: Grabów

Jastrzębia [jasˈtʂɛmbja] is a village in the administrative district of Gmina Grabów, within Łęczyca County, Łódź Voivodeship, in central Poland.
