= Budki, Łódź Voivodeship =

Budki
- Village
- Location within Poland
- Coordinates: 52°7′N 19°4′E
- Country: Poland
- Voivodeship: Łódź
- County: Łęczyca
- Gmina: Grabów

Budki [ˈbutki] is a village in the administrative district of Gmina Grabów, within Łęczyca County, Łódź Voivodeship, in central Poland.
