= Radzyń, Łódź Voivodeship =

Radzyń
- Village
- Location within Poland
- Coordinates: 52°12′N 18°59′E
- Country: Poland
- Voivodeship: Łódź
- County: Łęczyca
- Gmina: Grabów

Radzyń [ˈrad͡zɨɲ] is a village in the administrative district of Gmina Grabów, within Łęczyca County, Łódź Voivodeship, in central Poland.
