= Jaworów, Łódź Voivodeship =

Jaworów
- Village
- Location within Poland
- Coordinates: 52°08′52″N 19°04′12″E
- Country: Poland
- Voivodeship: Łódź
- County: Łęczyca
- Gmina: Grabów

Jaworów [jaˈvɔruf] is a village in the administrative district of Gmina Grabów, within Łęczyca County, Łódź Voivodeship, in central Poland.
