= Sławęcin, Łódź Voivodeship =

Sławęcin
- Village
- Location within Poland
- Coordinates: 52°8′N 19°5′E
- Country: Poland
- Voivodeship: Łódź
- County: Łęczyca
- Gmina: Grabów
- Time zone: UTC+1 (CET)
  - Summer (DST): UTC+2 (CEST)
- Vehicle registration: ELE

Sławęcin [swaˈvɛnt͡ɕin] is a village in the administrative district of Gmina Grabów, within Łęczyca County, Łódź Voivodeship, in central Poland.

During the German occupation of Poland (World War II), in 1942, the occupiers carried out expulsions of Poles, who were then either deported to forced labour in Germany and German-occupied France or enslaved as forced labour to serve new German colonists in the area.
