= Le Gac =

Le Gac is a French surname. Notable people with the surname include:

- Didier Le Gac (born 1965), French politician
- Jean Le Gac (1936–2025), French conceptual artist, painter, pastelist and photographer
- Olivier Le Gac (born 1993), French cyclist
- Romain Le Gac (born 1995), French-Canadian ice dancer
