= Bréguet 901 Mouette =

Single-seat French glider, 1954

901 Mouette
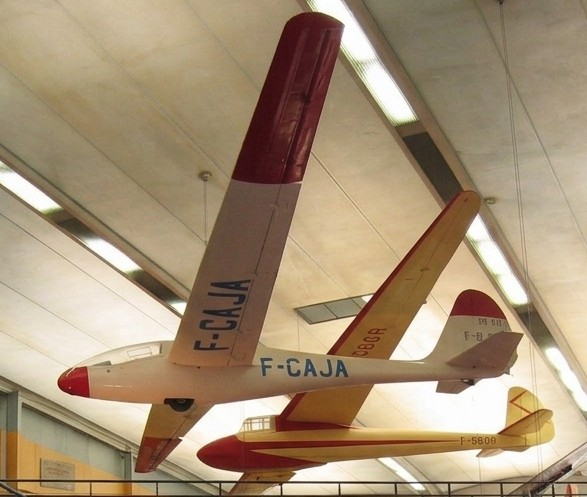
- a Breguet Br 901 Mouette at Musee de l'Air et de l'Espace in Le Bourget, France.

General information
- Type: Single seat competition sailplane
- National origin: France
- Manufacturer: Société des Ateliers d'Aviation Louis Breguet (Breguet Aviation)
- Designer: Jean Cayla
- Number built: c.36

History
- Manufactured: 1955-1959
- First flight: 11 March 1954

The Breguet 901 Mouette (English: Seagull) is a single seat French competition sailplane from the 1950s. It was the winner at both the 1954 and 1956 World Gliding Championships.

== Design and development ==
Breguet's first sailplane, the Type 900, had some success in national competitions but failed to impress at the two World Championships of 1950 and 1952, partly because of its short wingspan. The 901 is a development of this aircraft, retaining its mid wing layout and largely wooden construction. The wing of the 901 is straight tapered and built around a single spar, with a leading edge torsion box and fabric covered aft of the spar. On the 901 the torsion box was skinned with a plywood-klegecell (a plastic foam) sandwich rather than the ply of the 900. At 17.32 m (56 ft 10 in), its span is 2.97 m (9 ft 9 in) greater than the 900, raising the aspect ratio from 12.9 to 20. There are long span, short chord slotted flaps inboard, mid-chord airbrakes and tips finished with small "salmon" fairings. Both designs have plywood skinned fuselages, though that of the 901 is longer in the nose where the cockpit has an extended, single piece canopy.

The first two 901s built retained the curved vertical tail of the 900 but the third had a straight topped shape with a rudder that was straight edged except at the heel. The 901's undercarriage is a retractable monowheel, fitted with a brake, plus a tail bumper.

The 901 flew for the first time in March 1954. In 1956 it was developed into the 901S, which had a fuselage 510 mm (20 in) longer with a similar large area rudder like that of the 901 third prototype. A further development, the 901S1, had a more angular rudder and a fin without a fuselage fillet.

== Operational history ==
Gerard Pierre won the 1954 World Gliding Championships in the first prototype 901 only four months after its first flight. The second prototype, flown by G. Rousselet, finished in seventh place. By the time of the 1956 Championships the 901 had been developed into the 901S; Paul MacCready piloted it to a second Breguet championship victory.

As well as its international achievements the 901 set, and sometimes reset, numerous French national records.

Nine 901S remained on the French register in 2010.

== Variants ==
Production numbers from

901
Original version. Third example had a straight topped vertical tail with a straight edged rudder apart from a rounded heel. Retained fin-fuselage fillet. 3 built.
901S
510 mm longer, larger, tail similar to third 901, modified flaps, heavier. 21 built.
901S1
As 901 but with rudder straight edged without rounded heel, no fillet. 9 built.
901S2
3 built.

== Aircraft on display ==
Of the numerous 901s with French museums, two are on public display:

- Musée de l'Air et de l'Espace, Le Bourget, 901; F-CAJA the first prototype and 1954 World Championship winner.
- Musée Régional de l'Air, Marcé, 901S; F-CCCP

== Specifications (901S) ==
Data from Die berümtesten Segelflugzeuge

General characteristics

- Crew: 1
- Length: 7.57 m (24 ft 10 in)
- Wingspan: 17.32 m (56 ft 10 in)
- Wing area: 15.0 m^{2} (161 sq ft)
- Aspect ratio: 20
- Airfoil: NACA 63 series
- Empty weight: 265 kg (584 lb)
- Gross weight: 430 kg (948 lb)

Performance

- Stall speed: 62 km/h (39 mph, 33 kn)
- Never exceed speed: 220 km/h (140 mph, 120 kn)
- Rough air speed max: 180 km/h (111.8 mph; 97.2 kn)
- Aerotow speed: 150 km/h (93.2 mph; 81.0 kn)
- Maximum glide ratio: 35 at 85 km/h (52.8 mph; 45.9 kn)
- Rate of sink: 0.60 m/s (118 ft/min) at 72 km/h (44.7 mph; 38.9 kn)
- Wing loading: 28.0 kg/m^{2} (5.7 lb/sq ft)

== Bibliography ==
- Cuny, Jean & Leyvastre, Pierre (1977). Les Avions Breguet (1940/1971). DOCAVIA (in French). Vol. 6. Paris: Editions Larivière. OCLC 440863702.
- Lacaze, Henri (2016). Les avions Louis Breguet Paris [The Aircraft of Louis Breguet, Paris] (in French). Vol. 2: le règne du monoplan. Le Vigen, France. ISBN 978-2-914017-89-3.
