= Leźno =

- Village
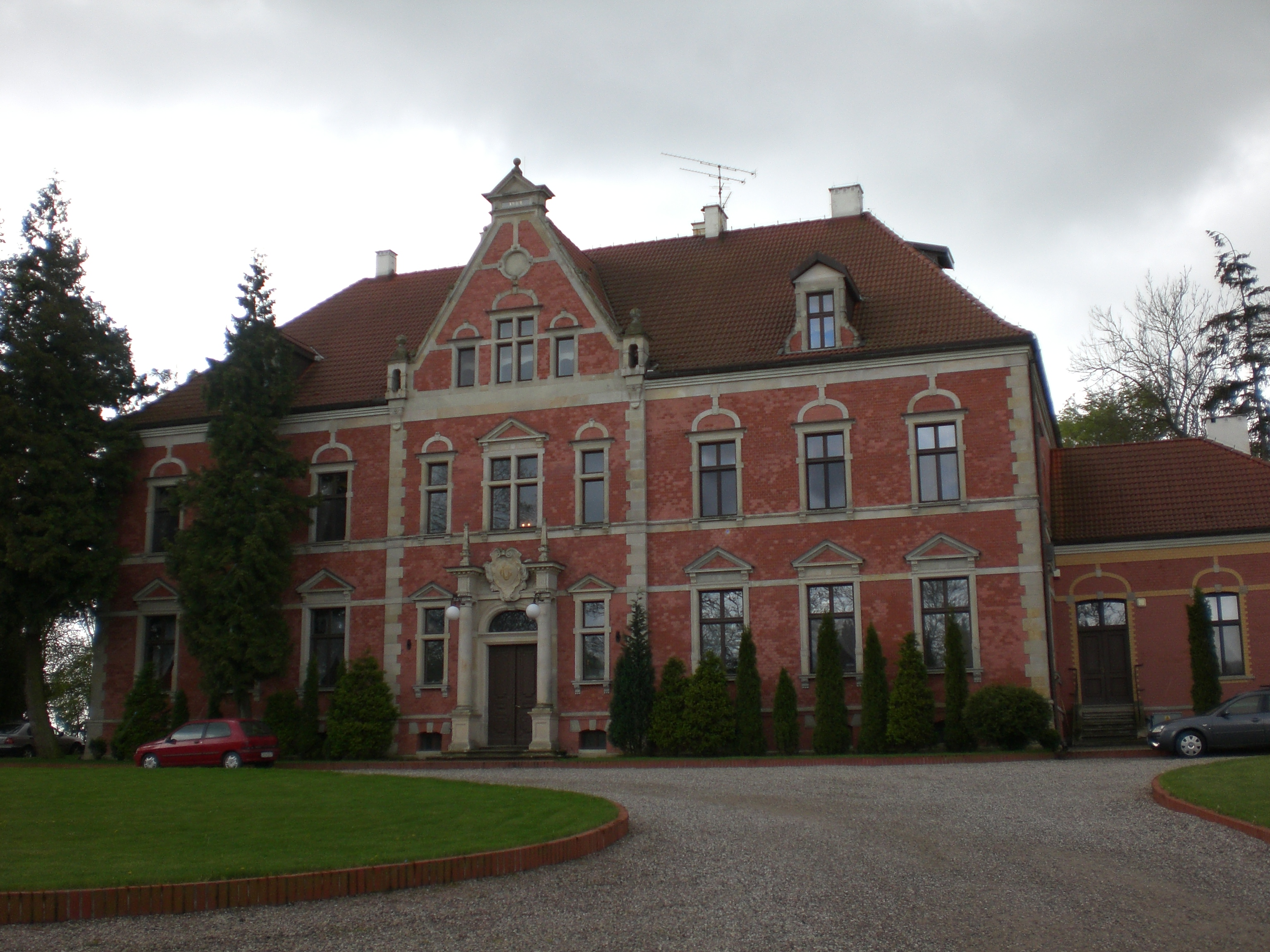
- Palace in Leźno

- Location within Poland
- Coordinates: 54°20′51″N 18°25′58″E
- Country: Poland
- Voivodeship: Pomeranian
- County: Kartuzy
- Gmina: Żukowo
- Population: 1,354
- Time zone: UTC+1 (CET)
  - Summer (DST): UTC+2 (CEST)

Leźno [ˈlɛʑnɔ] is a village in the administrative district of Gmina Żukowo, within Kartuzy County, Pomeranian Voivodeship, in northern Poland. It is located within the historic region of Pomerania.

Leźno was a royal village of the Polish Crown, administratively located in the Gdańsk County in the Pomeranian Voivodeship.

During the German occupation (World War II), Leźno was one of the sites of executions of Poles, carried out by the Germans in 1939 as part of the Intelligenzaktion.

== Notable people ==
- Wilhelm Joseph von Wasielewski (1822 – 1896) a German violinist, conductor, and musicologist.
