= Borovac =

Borovac is a Serbo-Croatian toponym, derived from bor, "pine tree", literally meaning "place of pines". It may refer to:

- Borovac (Banovići), a village in Bosnia and Herzegovina
- Borovac (Rogatica), a village in Bosnia and Herzegovina
- Borovac (Sokolac), a village in Bosnia and Herzegovina
- Borovac (Višegrad), a village in Bosnia and Herzegovina
- Borovac (Bujanovac), a village in Serbia
- Borovac, Medveđa, a village in Serbia
- Borovac (Zaječar), a village in Serbia
- Borovac, Croatia, a village near Novska
- Borovac (Goražde), a mountain Jahorina's peak near Goražde in Bosnia and Herzegovina

== See also ==
- Borovec
- Borowiec
