= Okopy =

Okopy may refer to:

- Okopy, Ternopil Oblast (Ukraine)
- Okopy, Lublin Voivodeship (east Poland)
- Okopy, Podlaskie Voivodeship (north-east Poland)
- Okopy, Masovian Voivodeship (east-central Poland)

== See also ==
- Okopy-Kolonia, Lublin Voivodeship, east Poland
