= Borovčanin =

Borovčanin (Serbian Cyrillic: Боровчанин) is a Bosnian and Serbian surname, derived from the demonym of Borovac. It is traditionally found in Bosnia and Herzegovina. It may refer to:

- Nenad Borovčanin (born 1979), Serbian politician and former boxer and European champion
- Drago Borovčanin, Yugoslav political historian
- Zoja Borovčanin, member of alternate rock group Lira Vega
- Vladimir "Šento" Borovčanin, member of pop-rock group Jutro
- Isidora Borovčanin, Bosnian model, 2014 Miss World Top Model
- Vedran Borovčanin, Bosnian basketballer
- Snežana Borovčanin, Bosnian skier
- Ljubomir Borovčanin, Republic of Srpska Police General and Commander of police special forces

== See also ==
- Borovica
- Borovac
- Borović
