= Michałówka =

Michałówka may refer to the following villages in Poland:

- Michałówka, Gmina Biała Podlaska in Lublin Voivodeship (east Poland)
- Michałówka, Chełm County in Lublin Voivodeship (east Poland)
- Michałówka, Janów County in Lublin Voivodeship (east Poland)
- Michałówka, Lubartów County in Lublin Voivodeship (east Poland)
- Michałówka, Parczew County in Lublin Voivodeship (east Poland)
- Michałówka, Łódź Voivodeship (central Poland)
- Michałówka, Lesser Poland Voivodeship (south Poland)
- Michałówka, Masovian Voivodeship (east-central Poland)
- Michałówka, Subcarpathian Voivodeship (south-east Poland)
- Michałówka, Podlaskie Voivodeship (north-east Poland)
- Michałówka, Kozienice County in Masovian Voivodeship (east-central Poland)
- Michałówka, Polish name for Mihailovca, Transnistria (Moldova)
