= Johannes von Leysen =

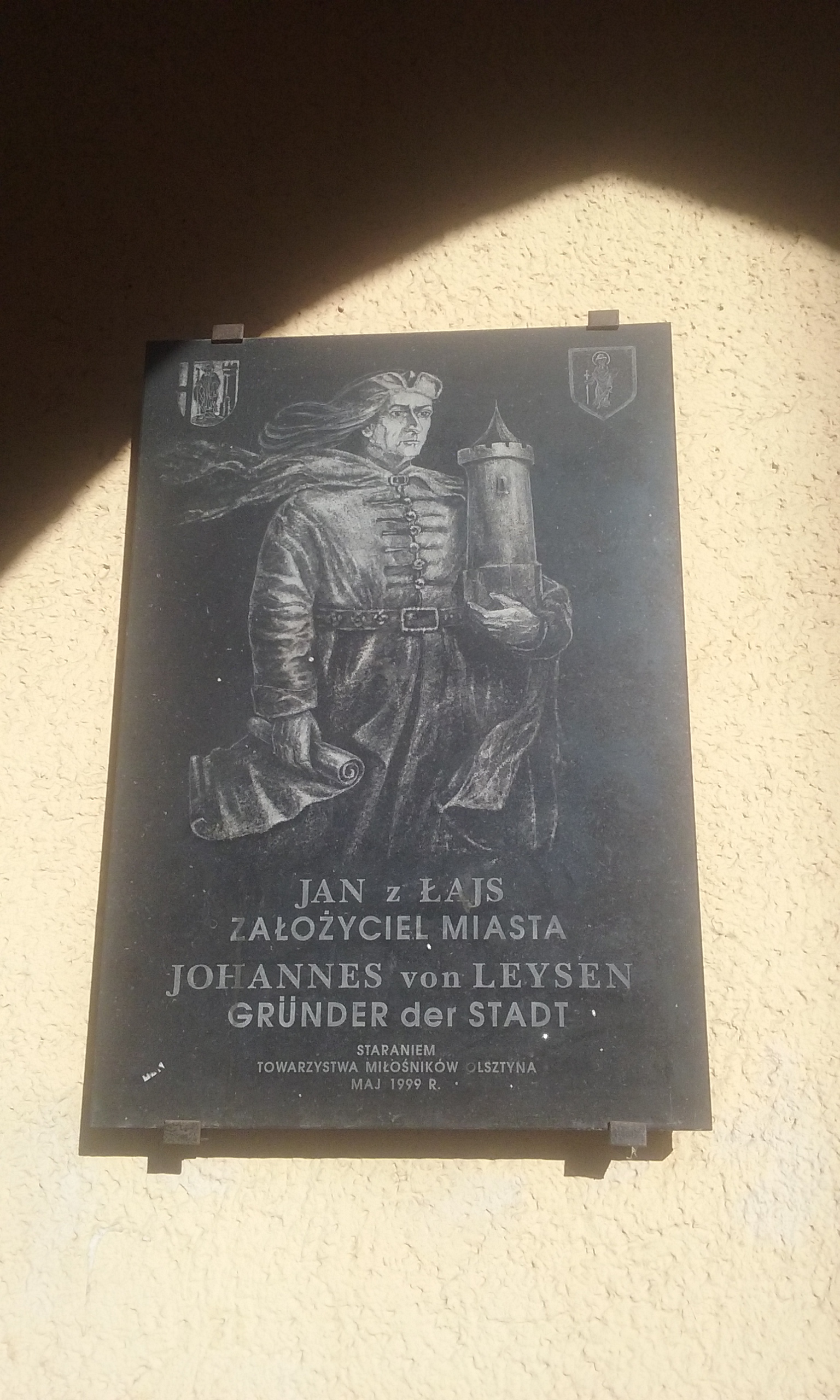
Johannes von Leysen, Olsztyn, 1999

Johannes von Leysen (also Leyssen, Laissen, Layß, Polish: Jan z Łajs; 1310 – 1388) was the first mayor of Allenstein (Polish: Olsztyn), Warmia in Prussia (now in Poland) in 1353.

Leysen came from a well-known family, recognized in colonizing southern Warmia within the State of the Teutonic Order. His grandfather Martin came to Prussia in 1304 as a free peasant, and was a founder and then Schultheiß of Layß (Łajsy) near Mehlsack (Pieniężno). His father Gerico inherited the position of Schultheiß from his father. Johannes's brother Heinrich von Leysen was the founder of Wartenberg (Wartembork, since 1946 Barczewo) and a village, Skaibotten (Skajboty).

On 13 October 1353, Leysen received a settlement privilege from the Bishopric of Warmia. In 1372 he was promoted to the German nobility, adding the preposition von.

== Literature ==
- Anton Funk: Geschichte der Stadt Allenstein 1348–1943. Scientia-Verlag, 1979, ISBN 3-511-09071-7
