= Orsetti =

Orsetti is a surname. Notable people with the surname include:

- Lorenzo Orsetti (1986–2019), Italian anarchist volunteer who fought in the Syrian Civil War
- Maria Orsetti (1880–1957), Polish cooperative organizer
