= Piekary =

Piekary may refer to the following places in Poland:

- Piekary, Oława County in Lower Silesian Voivodeship (south-west Poland)
- Piekary, Gmina Udanin, Środa County in Lower Silesian Voivodeship (south-west Poland)
- Piekary, Trzebnica County in Lower Silesian Voivodeship (south-west Poland)
- Piekary, Łęczyca County in Łódź Voivodeship (central Poland)
- Piekary, Pajęczno County in Łódź Voivodeship (central Poland)
- Piekary, Piotrków County in Łódź Voivodeship (central Poland)
- Piekary, Kraków County in Lesser Poland Voivodeship (south Poland)
- Piekary, Proszowice County in Lesser Poland Voivodeship (south Poland)
- Piekary, Świętokrzyskie Voivodeship (south-central Poland)
- Piekary, Masovian Voivodeship (east-central Poland)
- Piekary, Gniezno County in Greater Poland Voivodeship (west-central Poland)
- Piekary, Poznań County in Greater Poland Voivodeship (west-central Poland)
- Piekary, Turek County in Greater Poland Voivodeship (central Poland)
- Piekary, West Pomeranian Voivodeship (north-west Poland)
- Piekary Śląskie, Silesian Voivodeship
