= Kolonia (disambiguation) =

Kolonia is a town in Micronesia.

Kolonia may also refer to the following places:

- Kolonia, Chełm County in Lublin Voivodeship (east Poland)
- Kolonia, Podlaskie Voivodeship (north-east Poland)
- Kolonia, Gmina Tyszowce, Tomaszów County in Lublin Voivodeship (east Poland)
- Kolonia, Silesian Voivodeship (south Poland)
- Kolonia, Pomeranian Voivodeship (north Poland)
- Kolonia, Braniewo County in Warmian-Masurian Voivodeship (north Poland)
- Kolonia, Szczytno County in Warmian-Masurian Voivodeship (north Poland)
- Kolonia, formerly, a Palestinian Arab village, now called Motza
- Kolonia, Polish name for German city Cologne, North Rhine-Westphalia
- Kolonia, a type of rural administrative unit in Poland
