= Jasionna =

Jasionna may refer to the following places:

- Jasionna, Łęczyca County in Łódź Voivodeship (central Poland)
- Jasionna, Sieradz County in Łódź Voivodeship (central Poland)
- Jasionna, Skierniewice County in Łódź Voivodeship (central Poland)
- Jasionna, Zgierz County in Łódź Voivodeship (central Poland)
- Jasionna, Świętokrzyskie Voivodeship (south-central Poland)
- Jasionna, Masovian Voivodeship (east-central Poland)
- Jasionna, Greater Poland Voivodeship (west-central Poland)
- Jasionna, Lubusz Voivodeship (west Poland)
