= Janówek =

Janówek may refer to:

- Janówek, Karkonosze County in Lower Silesian Voivodeship (south-west Poland)
- Janówek, Wrocław County in Lower Silesian Voivodeship (south-west Poland)
- Janówek, Podlaskie Voivodeship (north-east Poland)
- Janówek, Bełchatów County in Łódź Voivodeship (central Poland)
- Janówek, Łęczyca County in Łódź Voivodeship (central Poland)
- Janówek, Gmina Mełgiew in Lublin Voivodeship (east Poland)
- Janówek, Gmina Piaski in Lublin Voivodeship (east Poland)
- Janówek, Garwolin County in Masovian Voivodeship (east-central Poland)
- Janówek, Gostynin County in Masovian Voivodeship (central Poland)
- Janówek, Grójec County in Masovian Voivodeship (east-central Poland)
- Janówek, Piaseczno County in Masovian Voivodeship (east-central Poland)
- Janówek, Sochaczew County in Masovian Voivodeship (east-central Poland)
- Janówek, Warsaw, a neighbourhood in Warsaw, Masovian Voivodeship, Poland
- Janówek, Węgrów County in Masovian Voivodeship (east-central Poland)
- Janówek, Gmina Mszczonów in Masovian Voivodeship (east-central Poland)
- Janówek, Gmina Wiskitki in Masovian Voivodeship (east-central Poland)
- Janówek, Gmina Czosnów, Nowy Dwór County in Masovian Voivodeship (east-central Poland)
- Janówek, Warmian-Masurian Voivodeship (north Poland)
