= Witów =

Witów may refer to the following places in Poland:

- Witów, Lower Silesian Voivodeship (south-west Poland)
- Witów, Kutno County in Łódź Voivodeship (central Poland)
- Witów, Łęczyca County in Łódź Voivodeship (central Poland)
- Witów, Piotrków County in Łódź Voivodeship (central Poland)
- Witów, Gmina Burzenin in Łódź Voivodeship (central Poland)
- Witów, Gmina Warta in Łódź Voivodeship (central Poland)
- Witów, Proszowice County in Lesser Poland Voivodeship (south Poland)
- Witów, Tatra County in Lesser Poland Voivodeship (south Poland)
- Witów, Silesian Voivodeship (south Poland)
