= Pawły =

Pawły is the name of two villages in Poland:

- Pawły, Podlaskie Voivodeship
- Pawły, Warmian-Masurian Voivodeship
