= Bielice =

Bielice may refer to the following places in Poland:

- Bielice, Lower Silesian Voivodeship (south-west Poland)
- Bielice, Kuyavian-Pomeranian Voivodeship (north-central Poland)
- Bielice, Kutno County in Łódź Voivodeship (central Poland)
- Bielice, Łęczyca County in Łódź Voivodeship (central Poland)
- Bielice, Płock County in Masovian Voivodeship (east-central Poland)
- Bielice, Gmina Sochaczew in Masovian Voivodeship (east-central Poland)
- Bielice, Nowa Sól County in Lubusz Voivodeship (west Poland)
- Bielice, Sulęcin County in Lubusz Voivodeship (west Poland)
- Bielice, Namysłów County in Opole Voivodeship (south-west Poland)
- Bielice, Nysa County in Opole Voivodeship (south-west Poland)
- Bielice, Warmian-Masurian Voivodeship (north Poland)
- Bielice, Drawsko County in West Pomeranian Voivodeship (north-west Poland)
- Bielice, Goleniów County in West Pomeranian Voivodeship (north-west Poland)
- Bielice, Pyrzyce County in West Pomeranian Voivodeship (north-west Poland)
