= Boguszyce =

Boguszyce may refer to the following places in Poland:

- Boguszyce, Oleśnica County in Lower Silesian Voivodeship (south-west Poland)
- Boguszyce, Strzelin County in Lower Silesian Voivodeship (south-west Poland)
- Boguszyce, Podlaskie Voivodeship (north-east Poland)
- Boguszyce, Łęczyca County in Łódź Voivodeship (central Poland)
- Boguszyce, Rawa County in Łódź Voivodeship (central Poland)
- Boguszyce, Greater Poland Voivodeship (west-central Poland)
- Boguszyce, Silesian Voivodeship (south Poland)
- Boguszyce, Opole Voivodeship (south-west Poland)
- Boguszyce, Pomeranian Voivodeship (north Poland)
- Boguszyce, Choszczno County in West Pomeranian Voivodeship (north-west Poland)
- Boguszyce, Goleniów County in West Pomeranian Voivodeship (north-west Poland)
- Boguszyce, Stargard County in West Pomeranian Voivodeship (north-west Poland)
