= Borowiec =

Borowiec (Polish pronunciation: [bɔˈrɔvjɛts]) may refer to the following places in Poland:

- Borowiec, Greater Poland Voivodeship (west-central Poland)
- Borówiec, Greater Poland Voivodeship
- Borowiec, Łęczyca County in Łódź Voivodeship (central Poland)
- Borowiec, Piotrków County in Łódź Voivodeship (central Poland)
- Borowiec, Radomsko County in Łódź Voivodeship (central Poland)
- Borowiec, Wieluń County in Łódź Voivodeship (central Poland)
- Borowiec, Lublin Voivodeship (east Poland)
- Borowiec, Lubusz Voivodeship (west Poland)
- Borowiec, Lipsko County in Masovian Voivodeship (east-central Poland)
- Borowiec, Piaseczno County in Masovian Voivodeship (east-central Poland)
- Borowiec, Gmina Kartuzy in Pomeranian Voivodeship (north Poland)
- Borowiec, Gmina Sulęczyno in Pomeranian Voivodeship (north Poland)
- Borowiec, Gmina Żukowo in Pomeranian Voivodeship (north Poland)
- Borowiec, Końskie County in Świętokrzyskie Voivodeship (south-central Poland)
- Borowiec, Włoszczowa County in Świętokrzyskie Voivodeship (south-central Poland)
- Borowiec, Warmian-Masurian Voivodeship (north Poland)
- Borowiec, Choszczno County in West Pomeranian Voivodeship (north-west Poland)
- Borowiec, Koszalin County in West Pomeranian Voivodeship (north-west Poland)

== See also ==
- Borovec
- Borovets
