= Krzyszkowice =

Krzyszkowice may refer to the following places:

- Krzyszkowice, Lesser Poland Voivodeship (south Poland)
- Krzyszkowice, Łódź Voivodeship (central Poland)
- Krzyszkowice, Masovian Voivodeship (east-central Poland)
- Krzyszkowice, Świętokrzyskie Voivodeship (south-central Poland)
- Krzyszkowice, district of Wieliczka
