= Pokrzywnica =

Pokrzywnica may refer to the following places:

- Pokrzywnica, Łódź Voivodeship (central Poland)
- Pokrzywnica, Jędrzejów County in Świętokrzyskie Voivodeship (south-central Poland)
- Pokrzywnica, Starachowice County in Świętokrzyskie Voivodeship (south-central Poland)
- Pokrzywnica, Pułtusk County in Masovian Voivodeship (east-central Poland)
- Pokrzywnica, Ostrołęka County in Masovian Voivodeship (east-central Poland)
- Pokrzywnica, Piła County in Greater Poland Voivodeship (west-central Poland)
- Pokrzywnica, Poznań County in Greater Poland Voivodeship (west-central Poland)
- Pokrzywnica, Śrem County in Greater Poland Voivodeship (west-central Poland)
- Pokrzywnica, Wągrowiec County in Greater Poland Voivodeship (west-central Poland)
- Pokrzywnica, Opole Voivodeship (south-west Poland)
