= Lubnica =

Lubnica may refer to the following places:

North Macedonia

- Lubnica, Konče

Poland

- Lubnica, Lubusz Voivodeship (west Poland)
- Lubnica, Greater Poland Voivodeship (west-central Poland)
- Łubnica, Greater Poland Voivodeship (west-central Poland)
- Łubnica, Łódź Voivodeship (central Poland)
- Łubnica, West Pomeranian Voivodeship (north-west Poland)

Serbia

- Lubnica, Zaječar, a village
