= Glady =

Glady may refer to:

== People ==
- Angel Glady, Indian trans woman prominent activist, educator, and theatre artist from Tamil Nadu

== Places ==
United States

- Glady, West Virginia
- Glady Fork, a river in West Virginia

Poland

- Glądy, Bartoszyce County in Warmian-Masurian Voivodeship (north Poland)
- Glądy, Braniewo County in Warmian-Masurian Voivodeship (north Poland)
- Glądy, Ostróda County in Warmian-Masurian Voivodeship (north Poland)
