= Włostowice =

Włostowice may refer to the following places:

- Włostowice, Lesser Poland Voivodeship (south Poland)
- Włostowice, Łódź Voivodeship (central Poland)
- Włostowice, Lubusz Voivodeship (west Poland)
- Włostowice, Puławy, a district of the town of Puławy in Lublin Voivodeship (east Poland)
