= Borovac (surname) =

Borovac is a surname. The Croatian census of 2011 listed it as one of the most common surnames in Funtana.

Notable people with the surname include:

- Semiha Borovac, a Bosnian lawyer and politician
- Mate Borovac, a Croatian footballer

== See also ==
- Borovac (disambiguation)
