= Turka, Chełm County =

Turka
- Village
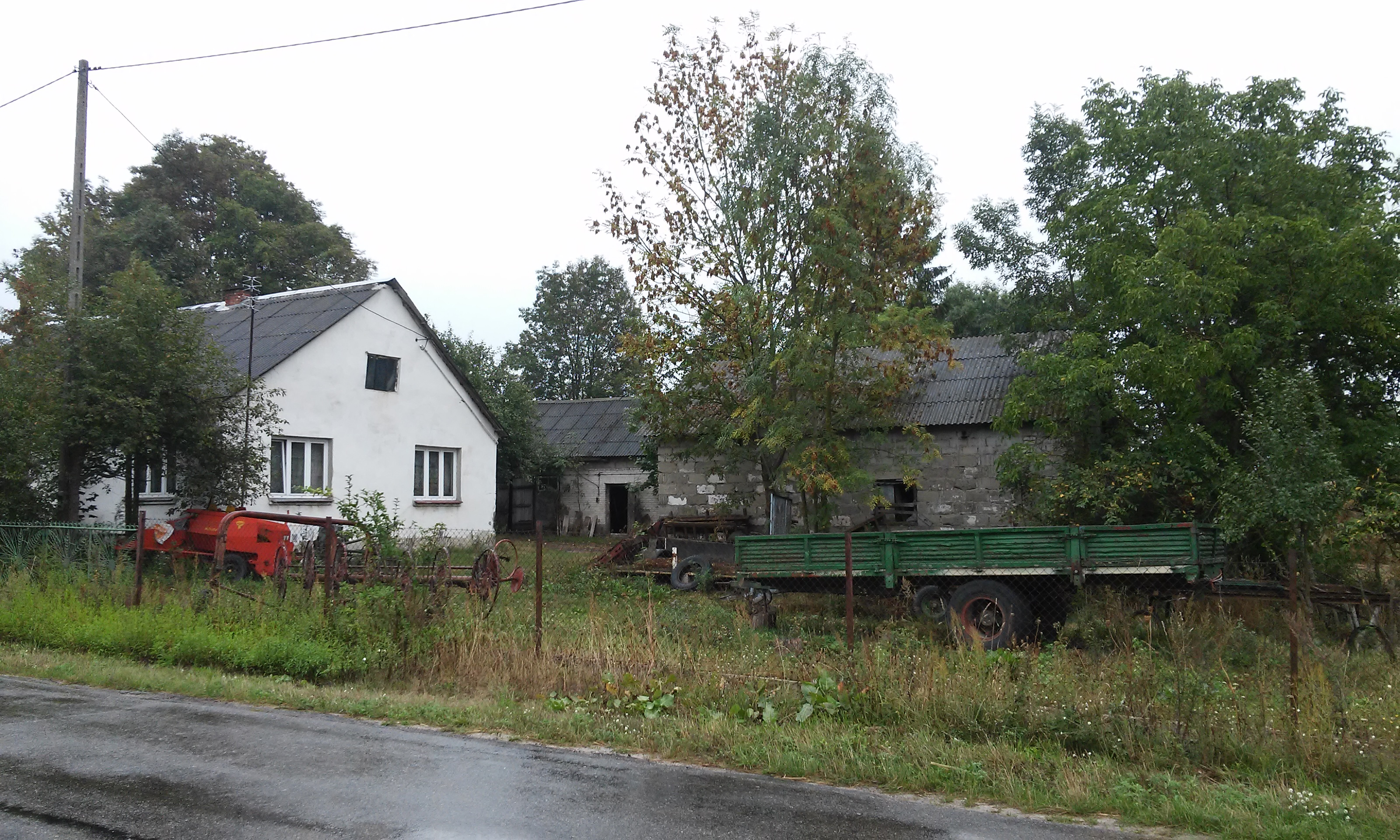

- Location within Poland
- Coordinates: 51°8′N 23°48′E
- Country: Poland
- Voivodeship: Lublin
- County: Chełm
- Gmina: Dorohusk

Population
  - Total: 315
- Time zone: UTC+1 (CET)
  - Summer (DST): UTC+2 (CEST)
- Postal code: 22-175
- Vehicle registration: LCH

Turka [ˈturka] is a village in the administrative district of Gmina Dorohusk, within Chełm County, Lublin Voivodeship, in eastern Poland, close to the border with Ukraine.

== History ==
Historical population
| Year | Pop. | ±% |
|---|---|---|
| 1827 | 536 | — |
| 1921 | 543 | +1.3% |

In 1921, 92.1% of the population was Polish.

Six Polish citizens were murdered by Nazi Germany in the village during World War II.
