= Kierpajny Małe =

- Village
- Location within Poland
- Coordinates: 54°11′36″N 20°1′31″E
- Country: Poland
- Voivodeship: Warmian-Masurian
- County: Braniewo
- Gmina: Pieniężno

Kierpajny Małe [kʲɛrˈpai̯nɨ ˈmawɛ] is a village in the administrative district of Gmina Pieniężno, within Braniewo County, Warmian-Masurian Voivodeship, in northern Poland.
