= Bornity =

- Village
- Location within Poland
- Coordinates: 54°11′48″N 20°3′41″E
- Country: Poland
- Voivodeship: (Warmian–Masurian Voivodeship) Warmian-Masurian
- County: Braniewo
- Gmina: Pieniężno

Bornity [bɔrˈnitɨ] is a village in the administrative district of Gmina Pieniężno, within Braniewo County, Warmian-Masurian Voivodeship, in northern Poland.
