= Sułkowice Pierwsze =

- Village
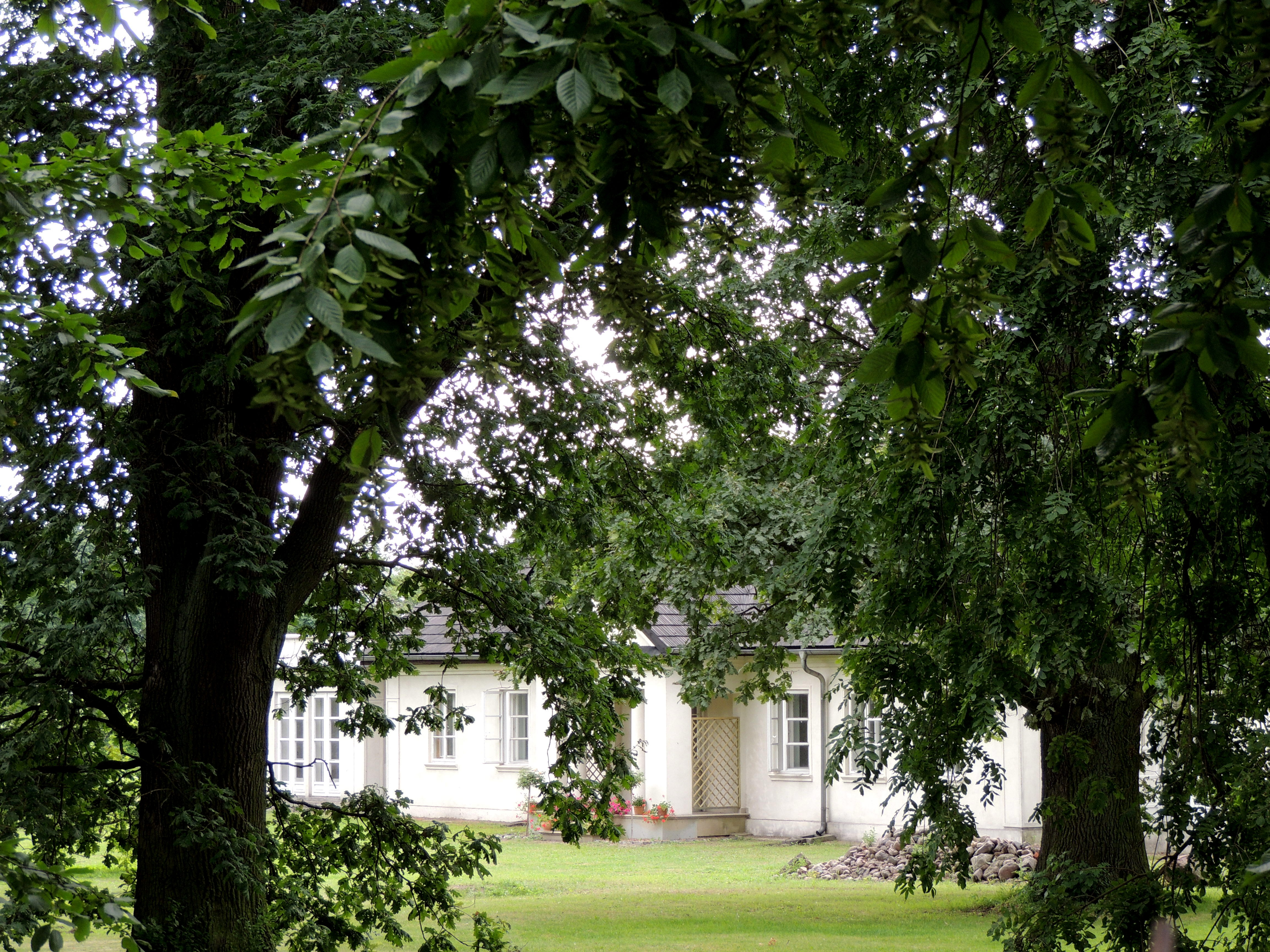
- Park

- Location within Poland
- Coordinates: 52°3′N 19°30′E
- Country: Poland
- Voivodeship: Łódź
- County: Łęczyca
- Gmina: Piątek

Sułkowice Pierwsze [suu̯kɔˈvit͡sɛ ˈpjɛrfʂɛ] is a village in the administrative district of Gmina Piątek, within Łęczyca County, Łódź Voivodeship, in central Poland.
