= Pogranicze, Lublin Voivodeship =

Pogranicze
- Village
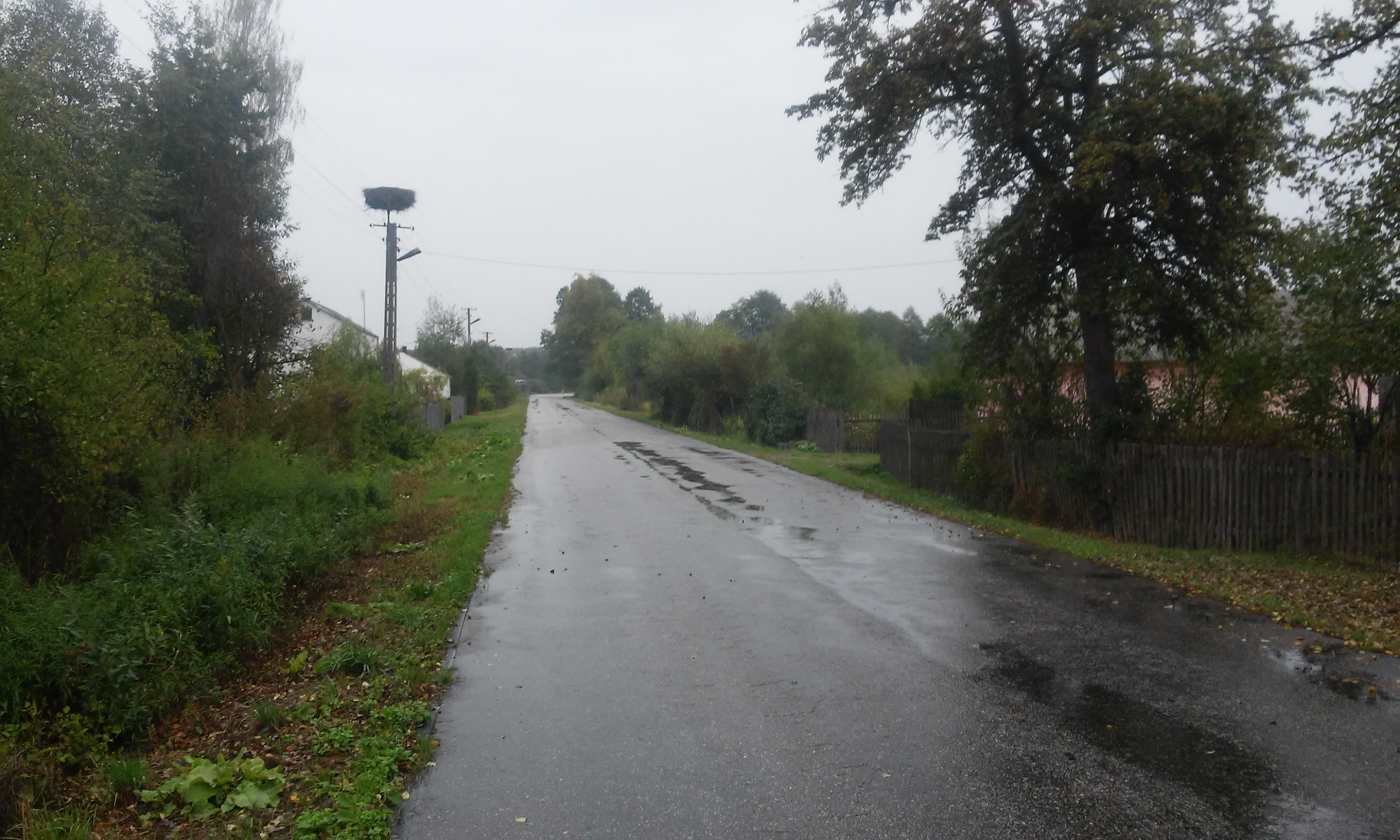

- Location within Poland
- Coordinates: 51°6′N 23°42′E
- Country: Poland
- Voivodeship: Lublin
- County: Chełm
- Gmina: Dorohusk
- Time zone: UTC+1 (CET)
  - Summer (DST): UTC+2 (CEST)

Pogranicze [pɔɡraˈnit͡ʂɛ] is a village in the administrative district of Gmina Dorohusk, within Chełm County, Lublin Voivodeship, in eastern Poland, close to the border with Ukraine.

== History ==
11 Polish citizens were murdered by Nazi Germany in the village during World War II.
