= Husynne, Chełm County =

Husynne
- Village
- Location within Poland
- Coordinates: 51°8′N 23°51′E
- Country: Poland
- Voivodeship: Lublin
- County: Chełm
- Gmina: Dorohusk

Population
  - Total: 286

Husynne [xuˈsɨnnɛ] is a village in the administrative district of Gmina Dorohusk, within the Chełm County, Lublin Voivodeship, in eastern Poland, close to the border with Ukraine.
