= Gmina Pieniężno =

Gmina Pieniężno Pieniężno Commune
- Gmina
- Flag Coat of arms
- Interactive map of Gmina Pieniężno
- Coordinates (Pieniężno): 54°13′N 20°7′E
- Country: Poland
- Voivodeship: Warmian-Masurian
- County: Braniewo
- Seat: Pieniężno

Area
  - Total: 241.43 km^{2} (93.22 sq mi)

Population (2006)
  - Total: 6,789
  - Density: 28.12/km^{2} (72.83/sq mi)
  - Urban: 2,915
  - Rural: 3,874
- Website: https://www.pieniezno.pl/

Gmina Pieniężno is an urban-rural gmina (administrative district) in Braniewo County, Warmian-Masurian Voivodeship, in northern Poland. Its seat is the town of Pieniężno, which lies approximately 27 kilometres (17 mi) south-east of Braniewo and 55 km (34 mi) north-west of the regional capital Olsztyn.

The gmina covers an area of 241.43 square kilometres (93.2 sq mi), and as of 2006 its total population is 6,789 (out of which the population of Pieniężno amounts to 2,915, and the population of the rural part of the gmina is 3,874).

== Villages ==
Apart from the town of Pieniężno, Gmina Pieniężno contains the villages and settlements of Białczyn, Bornity, Borowiec, Brzostki, Cieszęta, Gajle, Gaudyny, Glądy, Glebiska, Jesionowo, Jeziorko, Kajnity, Kierpajny Małe, Kierpajny Wielkie, Kiersiny, Kolonia, Kowale, Łajsy, Lechowo, Łoźnik, Lubianka, Niedbałki, Pajtuny, Pakosze, Pawły, Pełty, Pieniężno Drugie, Pieniężno Pierwsze, Piotrowiec, Pluty, Posady, Radziejewo, Różaniec, Sawity, Wojnity, Wopy, Wyrębiska and Żugienie.

== Neighbouring gminas ==
Gmina Pieniężno is bordered by the gminas of Braniewo, Górowo Iławeckie, Lelkowo, Lidzbark Warmiński, Orneta and Płoskinia.
