= Zamieście, Lublin Voivodeship =

Zamieście
- Village
- Location within Poland
- Coordinates: 51°11′47″N 23°44′5″E
- Country: Poland
- Voivodeship: Lublin
- County: Chełm
- Gmina: Dorohusk

Zamieście [zaˈmjɛɕt͡ɕɛ] is a village in the administrative district of Gmina Dorohusk, within Chełm County, Lublin Voivodeship, in eastern Poland, close to the border with Ukraine.
