= Konarzew, Łęczyca County =

Konarzew
- Village
- Location within Poland
- Coordinates: 52°02′06″N 19°29′26″E
- Country: Poland
- Voivodeship: Łódź
- County: Łęczyca
- Gmina: Piątek

Konarzew [kɔˈnaʐɛf] is a village in the administrative district of Gmina Piątek, within Łęczyca County, Łódź Voivodeship, in central Poland.
