= Górki Łubnickie =

Village in Gmina Piatek, Poland

- Village
- Location within Poland
- Coordinates: 52°03′10″N 19°25′44″E
- Country: Poland
- Voivodeship: Łódź
- County: Łęczyca
- Gmina: Piątek

Górki Łubnickie [ˈɡurki wubˈnit͡skʲɛ] is a village in the administrative district of Gmina Piątek, within Łęczyca County, Łódź Voivodeship, in central Poland.
