= Pakosze =

- Village
- Location within Poland
- Coordinates: 54°14′56″N 20°1′57″E
- Country: Poland
- Voivodeship: Warmian-Masurian
- County: Braniewo
- Gmina: Pieniężno

Pakosze [paˈkɔʂɛ] is a village in the administrative district of Gmina Pieniężno, within Braniewo County, Warmian-Masurian Voivodeship, in northern Poland.
