= Pluty, Warmian-Masurian Voivodeship =

Pluty
- Village
- Location within Poland
- Coordinates: 54°16′N 20°17′E
- Country: Poland
- Voivodeship: Warmian-Masurian
- County: Braniewo
- Gmina: Pieniężno

Pluty [ˈplutɨ] is a village in the administrative district of Gmina Pieniężno, within Braniewo County, Warmian-Masurian Voivodeship, in northern Poland.
