= Pęcławice =

- Village
- Location within Poland
- Coordinates: 52°07′38″N 19°30′06″E
- Country: Poland
- Voivodeship: Łódź
- County: Łęczyca
- Gmina: Piątek

Pęcławice [pɛnt͡swaˈvit͡sɛ] is a village in the administrative district of Gmina Piątek, within Łęczyca County, Łódź Voivodeship, in central Poland.
