= Piotrowiec, Warmian-Masurian Voivodeship =

Piotrowiec
- Village
- Location within Poland
- Coordinates: 54°18′N 20°6′E
- Country: Poland
- Voivodeship: Warmian-Masurian
- County: Braniewo
- Gmina: Pieniężno

Piotrowiec [pjɔˈtrɔvjɛt͡s] is a village in the administrative district of Gmina Pieniężno, within Braniewo County, Warmian-Masurian Voivodeship, in northern Poland.

Before 1772 the area was part of Kingdom of Poland, and in 1772–1945 it belonged to Prussia and Germany (East Prussia).
