= Żabokrzeki, Gmina Piątek =

Żabokrzeki
- Village
- Location within Poland
- Coordinates: 52°03′06″N 19°24′15″E
- Country: Poland
- Voivodeship: Łódź
- County: Łęczyca
- Gmina: Piątek

Żabokrzeki [ʐabɔˈkʂɛki] is a village in the administrative district of Gmina Piątek, within Łęczyca County, Łódź Voivodeship, in central Poland.

== History ==
In the years 1975–1998 the town was part of the administration of the Płock Province. Since 1999 it has been part of the New Łódź Voivodeship.

== Demography ==
Demographic structure as of March 31, 2011:

	Total	Working age	Working age	Post-working age
Men	49	16	26	7
Women	44	9	22	13
Total	93	25	48	20
