= Leżajna =

Village in Gmina Piątek, Poland

- Village
- Location within Poland
- Coordinates: 52°02′39″N 19°32′09″E
- Country: Poland
- Voivodeship: Łódź
- County: Łęczyca
- Gmina: Piątek

Leżajna [lɛˈʐai̯na] is a village in the administrative district of Gmina Piątek, within Łęczyca County, Łódź Voivodeship, in central Poland.
