= Kajnity =

- Village
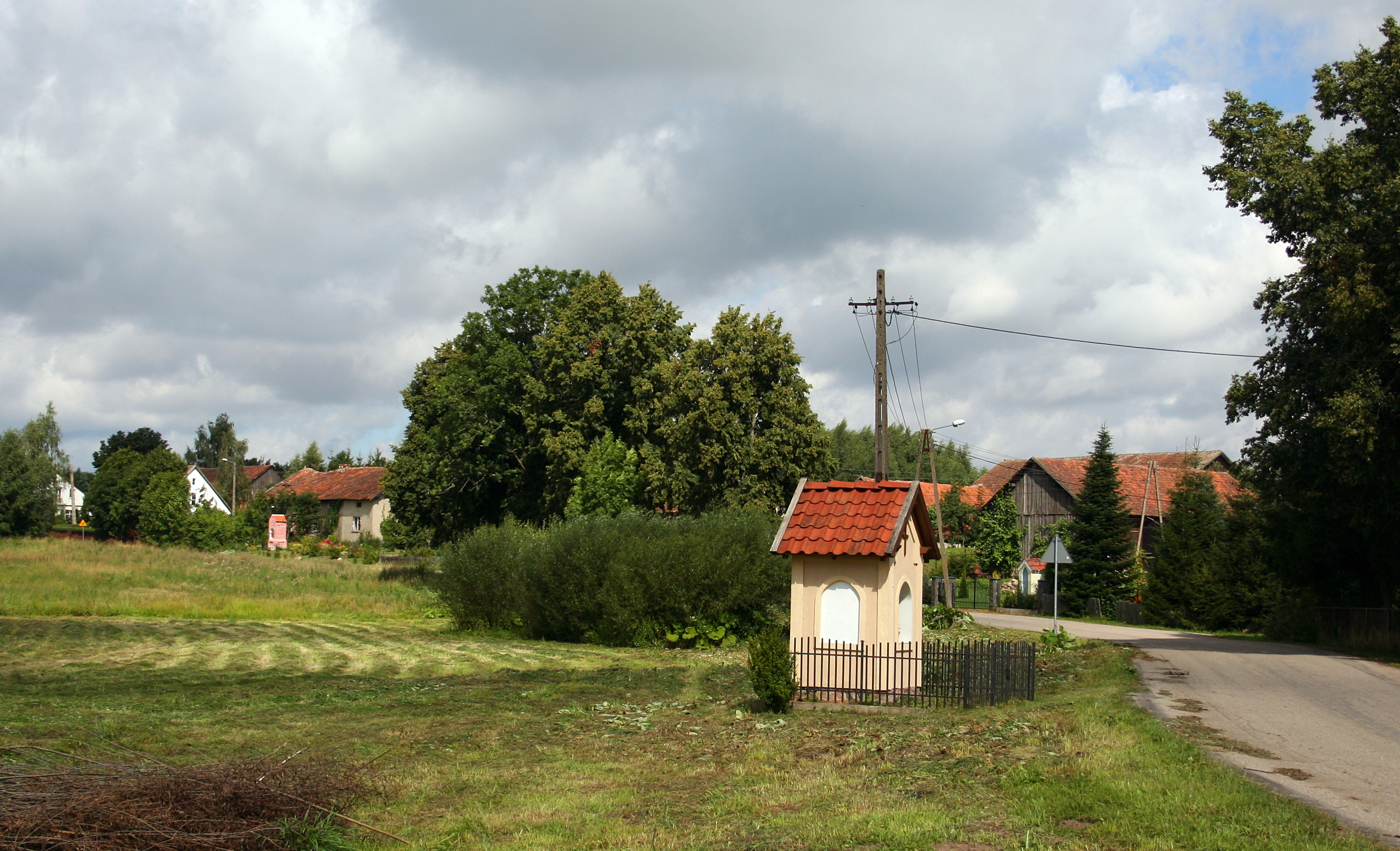
- Chapel in the village

- Location within Poland
- Coordinates: 54°13′37″N 20°04′11″E
- Country: Poland
- Voivodeship: Warmian-Masurian
- County: Braniewo
- Gmina: Pieniężno

Kajnity [kai̯ˈnitɨ] is a village in the administrative district of Gmina Pieniężno, within Braniewo County, Warmian-Masurian Voivodeship, in northern Poland.
