= Jesionowo, Braniewo County =

Jesionowo
- Village
- Location within Poland
- Coordinates: 54°12′N 20°19′E
- Country: Poland
- Voivodeship: Warmian-Masurian
- County: Braniewo
- Gmina: Pieniężno

Jesionowo [jɛɕɔˈnɔvɔ] is a village in the administrative district of Gmina Pieniężno, within Braniewo County, Warmian-Masurian Voivodeship, in northern Poland.
