= Berdyszcze =

- Village
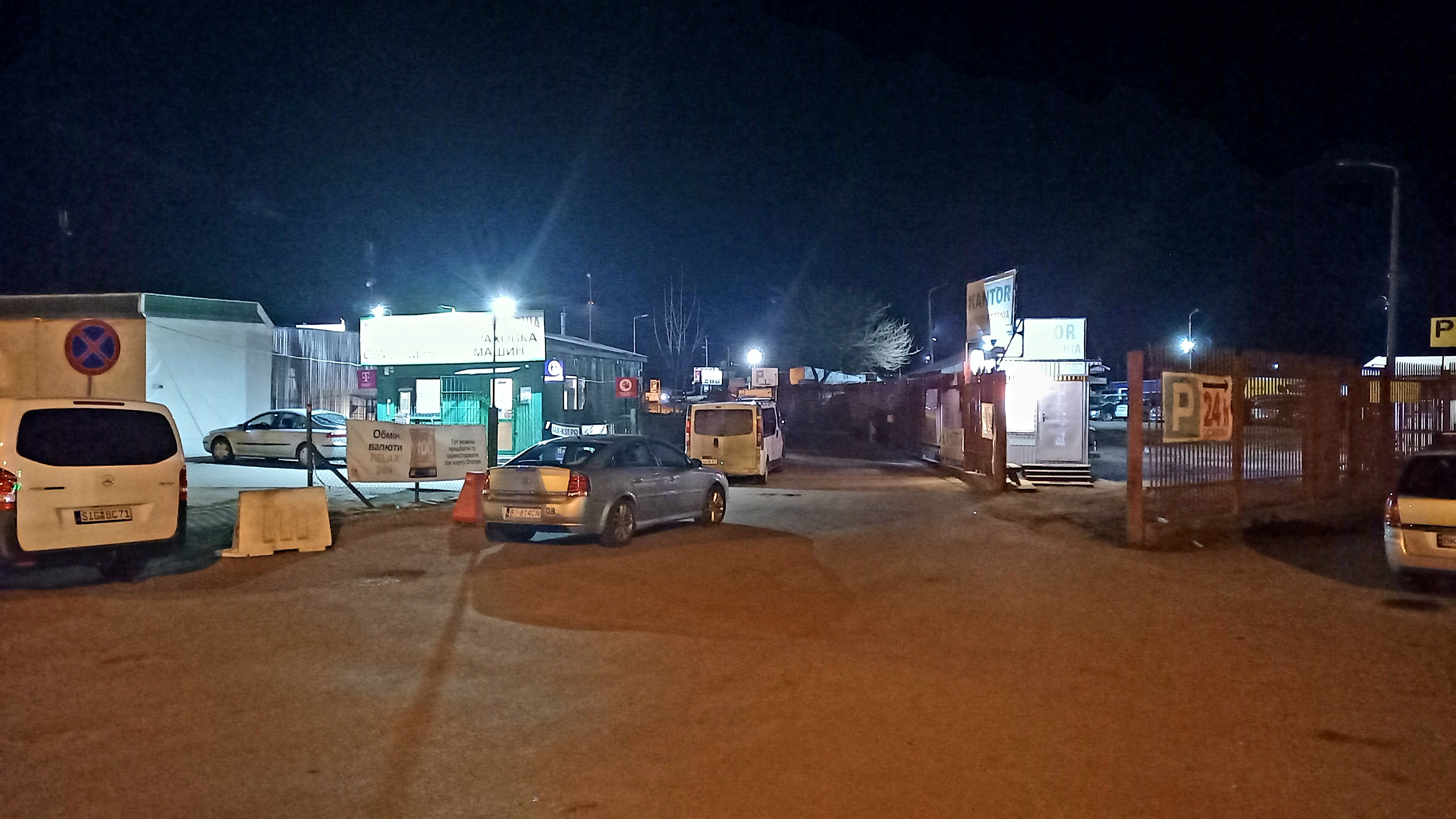
- Berdyszcze, March 2022

- Location within Poland
- Coordinates: 51°10′49″N 23°47′29″E
- Country: Poland
- Voivodeship: Lublin
- County: Chełm
- Gmina: Dorohusk

Population
  - Total: 60

Berdyszcze [bɛrˈdɨʂt͡ʂɛ] is a village in the administrative district of Gmina Dorohusk, within Chełm County, Lublin Voivodeship, in eastern Poland, close to the border with Ukraine.
