= Brzostki =

- Village
- Location within Poland
- Coordinates: 54°14′N 20°3′E
- Country: Poland
- Voivodeship: Warmian-Masurian
- County: Braniewo
- Gmina: Pieniężno

Brzostki [ˈbʐɔstki] is a village in the administrative district of Gmina Pieniężno, within Braniewo County, Warmian-Masurian Voivodeship, in northern Poland.

== History ==
The suffix -hagen of the historic village name is typical for settlements founded by Germans during Medieval Ostsiedlung.
