= Cieszęta =

- Village
- Location within Poland
- Coordinates: 54°12′05″N 20°07′47″E
- Country: Poland
- Voivodeship: Warmian-Masurian
- County: Braniewo
- Gmina: Pieniężno

Cieszęta [t͡ɕɛˈʂɛnta] is a village in the administrative district of Gmina Pieniężno, within Braniewo County, Warmian-Masurian Voivodeship, in northern Poland.

Before 1772 the area was part of the Kingdom of Poland, and from 1772 to 1945 it belonged to the German province of East Prussia.
