= Rozkosz =

- Village
- Location within Poland
- Coordinates: 51°09′00″N 23°41′21″E
- Country: Poland
- Voivodeship: Lublin
- County: Chełm
- Gmina: Dorohusk

Rozkosz [ˈrɔskɔʂ] is a village in the administrative district of Gmina Dorohusk, within Chełm County, Lublin Voivodeship, in eastern Poland, close to the border with Ukraine.

== Demographics ==
As per census 2021, Rozkosz has a population of 97, of which, 46 are males and 51 females.
