= Mościska, Chełm County =

Mościska
- Village
- Location within Poland
- Coordinates: 51°5′39″N 23°49′28″E
- Country: Poland
- Voivodeship: Lublin
- County: Chełm
- Gmina: Dorohusk

Population
  - Total: 60

Mościska [mɔɕˈt͡ɕiska] is a village in the administrative district of Gmina Dorohusk, within Chełm County, Lublin Voivodeship, in eastern Poland, close to the border with Ukraine.
