= Gmina Dorohusk =

Gmina Dorohusk Dorohusk Commune
- Gmina
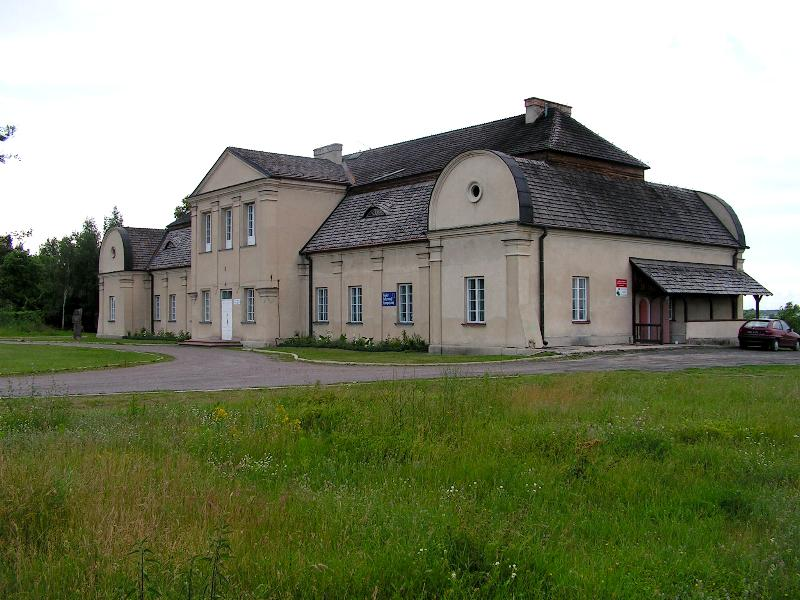

- Coat of arms
- Interactive map of Gmina Dorohusk
- Coordinates (Dorohusk): 51°10′N 23°49′E
- Country: Poland
- Voivodeship: Lublin
- County: Chełm County
- Seat: Dorohusk

Area
  - Total: 192.42 km^{2} (74.29 sq mi)

Population (2006)
  - Total: 6,936
  - Density: 36.05/km^{2} (93.36/sq mi)
- Website: http://www.dorohusk.com.pl/

Gmina Dorohusk is a rural gmina (administrative district) in Chełm County, Lublin Voivodeship, in eastern Poland, on the border with Ukraine. Its seat is the village of Dorohusk, which lies approximately 24 kilometres (15 mi) east of Chełm and 88 km (55 mi) east of the regional capital Lublin.

The gmina covers an area of 192.42 square kilometres (74.3 sq mi), and as of 2006 its total population is 6,936.

The gmina contains part of the protected area called Chełm Landscape Park.

== Villages ==
Gmina Dorohusk contains the villages and settlements of Barbarówka, Berdyszcze, Brzeźno, Dobryłówka, Dorohusk, Dorohusk-Osada, Husynne, Kępa, Kolemczyce, Kroczyn, Ladeniska, Ludwinów, Majdan Skordiowski, Michałówka, Mościska, Myszkowiec, Okopy, Okopy-Kolonia, Olenówka, Ostrów, Pogranicze, Puszki, Rozkosz, Skordiów, Stefanów, Świerże, Teosin, Turka, Wólka Okopska, Zalasocze, Zamieście and Zanowinie.

== Neighbouring gminas ==
Gmina Dorohusk is bordered by the gminas of Chełm, Dubienka, Kamień, Ruda-Huta and Żmudź. It also borders Ukraine.
