= Włostowice-Parcele =

- Village
- Location within Poland
- Coordinates: 52°07′18″N 19°28′37″E
- Country: Poland
- Voivodeship: Łódź
- County: Łęczyca
- Gmina: Piątek

Włostowice-Parcele [vwɔstɔˈvit͡sɛ parˈt͡sɛlɛ] is a village in the administrative district of Gmina Piątek, within Łęczyca County, Łódź Voivodeship, in central Poland.
