= Kiersiny =

- Village
- Location within Poland
- Coordinates: 54°18′N 20°5′E
- Country: Poland
- Voivodeship: Warmian-Masurian
- County: Braniewo
- Gmina: Pieniężno

Kiersiny [kʲɛrˈɕinɨ] is a village in the administrative district of Gmina Pieniężno, within Braniewo County, Warmian-Masurian Voivodeship, in northern Poland.
