= Janków, Gmina Piątek =

Janków
- Village
- Location within Poland
- Coordinates: 52°06′55″N 19°31′27″E
- Country: Poland
- Voivodeship: Łódź
- County: Łęczyca
- Gmina: Piątek

Janków [ˈjankuf] is a village in the administrative district of Gmina Piątek, within Łęczyca County, Łódź Voivodeship, in central Poland.
