= Teosin =

- Village
- Location within Poland
- Coordinates: 51°9′N 23°45′E
- Country: Poland
- Voivodeship: Lublin
- County: Chełm
- Gmina: Dorohusk

Teosin [tɛˈɔɕin] is a village in the administrative district of Gmina Dorohusk, within Chełm County, Lublin Voivodeship, in eastern Poland, close to the border with Ukraine.
