= Majdan Skordiowski =

- Village
- Location within Poland
- Coordinates: 51°5′56″N 23°44′59″E
- Country: Poland
- Voivodeship: Lublin
- County: Chełm
- Gmina: Dorohusk

Population
  - Total: 140

Majdan Skordiowski (Polish pronunciation: [ˈmajdan skɔrˈdjɔfskʲi]) is a village in the administrative district of Gmina Dorohusk, within Chełm County, Lublin Voivodeship, in eastern Poland, close to the border with Ukraine.
