= Rogaszyn, Łęczyca County =

Rogaszyn
- Village
- Location within Poland
- Coordinates: 52°6′N 19°30′E
- Country: Poland
- Voivodeship: Łódź
- County: Łęczyca
- Gmina: Piątek

Rogaszyn [rɔˈɡaʂɨn] is a village in the administrative district of Gmina Piątek, within Łęczyca County, Łódź Voivodeship, in central Poland.
