= Ostrów, Gmina Dorohusk =

Ostrów
- Village
- Location within Poland
- Coordinates: 51°6′54″N 23°46′37″E
- Country: Poland
- Voivodeship: Lublin
- County: Chełm
- Gmina: Dorohusk

Population
  - Total: 230
- Time zone: UTC+1 (CET)
  - Summer (DST): UTC+2 (CEST)

Ostrów [ˈɔstruf] is a village in the administrative district of Gmina Dorohusk, within Chełm County, Lublin Voivodeship, in eastern Poland, close to the border with Ukraine.

== History ==
13 Polish citizens were murdered by Nazi Germany in the village during World War II.
