= Goślub-Osada =

Village in Gmina Piatek, Poland

- Village
- Location within Poland
- Coordinates: 52°05′52″N 19°27′14″E
- Country: Poland
- Voivodeship: Łódź
- County: Łęczyca
- Gmina: Piątek

Goślub-Osada [ˈɡɔɕlup ɔˈsada] is a village in the administrative district of Gmina Piątek, within Łęczyca County, Łódź Voivodeship, in central Poland.
