= Dorohusk-Osada =

- Village
- Location within Poland
- Coordinates: 51°10′22.58″N 23°47′17.37″E
- Country: Poland
- Voivodeship: Lublin
- County: Chełm
- Gmina: Dorohusk

Dorohusk-Osada [dɔˈrɔxusk ɔˈsada] is a village in the administrative district of Gmina Dorohusk, within Chełm County, Lublin Voivodeship, in eastern Poland, close to the border with Ukraine.
