= Gmina Piątek =

Gmina Piątek Piątek Commune
- Gmina
- Flag Coat of arms
- Interactive map of Gmina Piątek
- Coordinates (Piątek): 52°4′9″N 19°28′50″E
- Country: Poland
- Voivodeship: Łódź
- County: Łęczyca
- Seat: Piątek

Area
  - Total: 133.2 km^{2} (51.4 sq mi)

Population (2006)
  - Total: 6,574
  - Density: 49.35/km^{2} (127.8/sq mi)

Gmina Piątek is a rural gmina (administrative district) in Łęczyca County, Łódź Voivodeship, in central Poland. Its seat is the village of Piątek, which lies approximately 20 kilometres (12 mi) east of Łęczyca and 32 km (20 mi) north of the regional capital Łódź.

The gmina covers an area of 133.2 square kilometres (51.4 sq mi), and as of 2006 its total population is 6,574.

== Villages ==
Gmina Piątek contains the villages and settlements of Balków, Bielice, Boguszyce, Borowiec, Broników, Czerników, Górki Łubnickie, Górki Pęcławskie, Goślub, Goślub-Osada, Janków, Janówek, Janowice, Jasionna, Konarzew, Krzyszkowice, Łęka, Leżajna, Łubnica, Mchowice, Michałówka, Młynów, Mysłówka, Orądki, Orenice, Pęcławice, Piątek, Piekary, Pokrzywnica, Rogaszyn, Śladków Podleśny, Śladków Rozlazły, Stare Piaski, Sułkowice Drugie, Sułkowice Pierwsze, Sypin, Witów, Włostowice, Włostowice-Parcele and Żabokrzeki.

== Neighbouring gminas ==
Gmina Piątek is bordered by the gminas of Bedlno, Bielawy, Głowno, Góra Świętej Małgorzaty, Krzyżanów and Zgierz.
