= Stare Piaski, Łęczyca County =

Stare Piaski
- Village
- Location within Poland
- Coordinates: 52°02′44″N 19°32′56″E
- Country: Poland
- Voivodeship: Łódź
- County: Łęczyca
- Gmina: Piątek

Stare Piaski (Polish pronunciation: [ˈstarɛ ˈpjaskʲi]) is a village in the administrative district of Gmina Piątek, within Łęczyca County, Łódź Voivodeship, in central Poland.
