= Maria Orsetti =

Polish cooperative organiser (1880–1957)

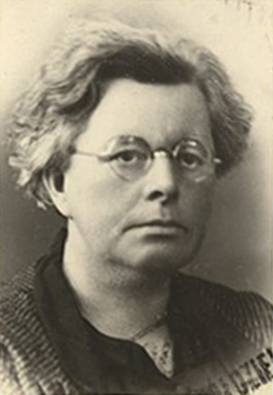
- Orsetti in 1939
- Born: 22 June 1880; Świerże, Lublin, Congress Poland
- Died: 27 May 1957 (aged 76); Warsaw, Polish People's Republic
- Resting place: Powązki Cemetery
- Movement: Cooperative movement

Maria Paulina Orsetti (June 22, 1880 – May 27, 1957) was a Polish cooperative organiser. A leading figure in the Polish cooperativist movement, she established consumers' cooperatives, housing cooperatives and workers' cooperatives for women.

== Biography ==
Maria Orsetti was born in 1880. She studied economics and social science in Belgium, graduating with a Doctorate. After returning to Poland, she became a leading figure in the cooperative movement, leaving behind her career as an academic.

She wrote and translated numerous works on the subject of cooperativism, popularising the works of the Russian anarchist Peter Kropotkin, and the French socialist Charles Fourier. She was critical of the utopian socialism espoused by Robert Owen, which she thought acted in contrary to cooperative and participative principles. Orsetti was an anarchist, believing in the need for a grassroots movement to dismantle capitalism. She advocated for mutual aid as a path to workers' empowerment within a market economy.

In 1921, she co-founded a housing cooperative in Warsaw, together with members of the Communist Party of Poland, including Bolesław Bierut. She also established a consumers' cooperative in Lublin, which developed a reputation as one of the most successful and radical cooperatives in the country. During the 1920s and 1930s, she worked as editor-in-chief of the magazine Społem! (English: Together!), edited Spółdzielczy (English: The Cooperative Worker), the magazine of the cooperative workers' trade union, and directed the publishing cooperative Książka She was also a delegate to international cooperative conventions in western Europe. During one of her visits to the United Kingdom, she was inspired to establish a cooperative laundry room, which she created in Żoliborz in 1930. According to her, the cooperative laundry room shared the benefits of mechanical and physical labour with all its members, who benefited from low prices and good working conditions. Despite her efforts, the enterprise wasn't successful, often devolving into interpersonal conflict, with one woman describing it as "women's hell".

She organised women's cooperatives throughout the country, modelled on a cooperative society she had established in Żoliborz. In 1929, she co-founded the Active Cooperativists' Club, which aimed to educate women and remove any obstacles to their participation in the cooperative economy. She suggested the name of "Active Cooperativists" herself, as she thought that every woman in a cooperative should be responsible for a certain function. In 1935, she co-founded the Cooperative Women's Guild.

She died in 1957.

== Selected works ==
- Robert Owen, A great friend of humanity (1771–1858) (1926)
- Charles Fourier: The Apostle of Joyous Work (1927, Warsaw)
- Woman, Whose Name is Millions: On the Responsibilities of Women in the Cooperative Movement (1933, Kraków)

== Bibliography ==
- Błesznowski, Bartłomiej, ed. (2018). Cooperativism and Democracy: Selected Works of Polish Thinkers. Translated by Granas, Michelle. Brill}. ISBN 978-90-04-29700-5.
- Matysek-Imielińska, Magdalena (2020). Warsaw Housing Cooperative: City in Action. The Urban Book Series. Springer. doi:10.1007/978-3-030-23077-7. ISBN 978-3-030-23076-0.
