= Piątek, Łódź Voivodeship =

Piątek
- Town
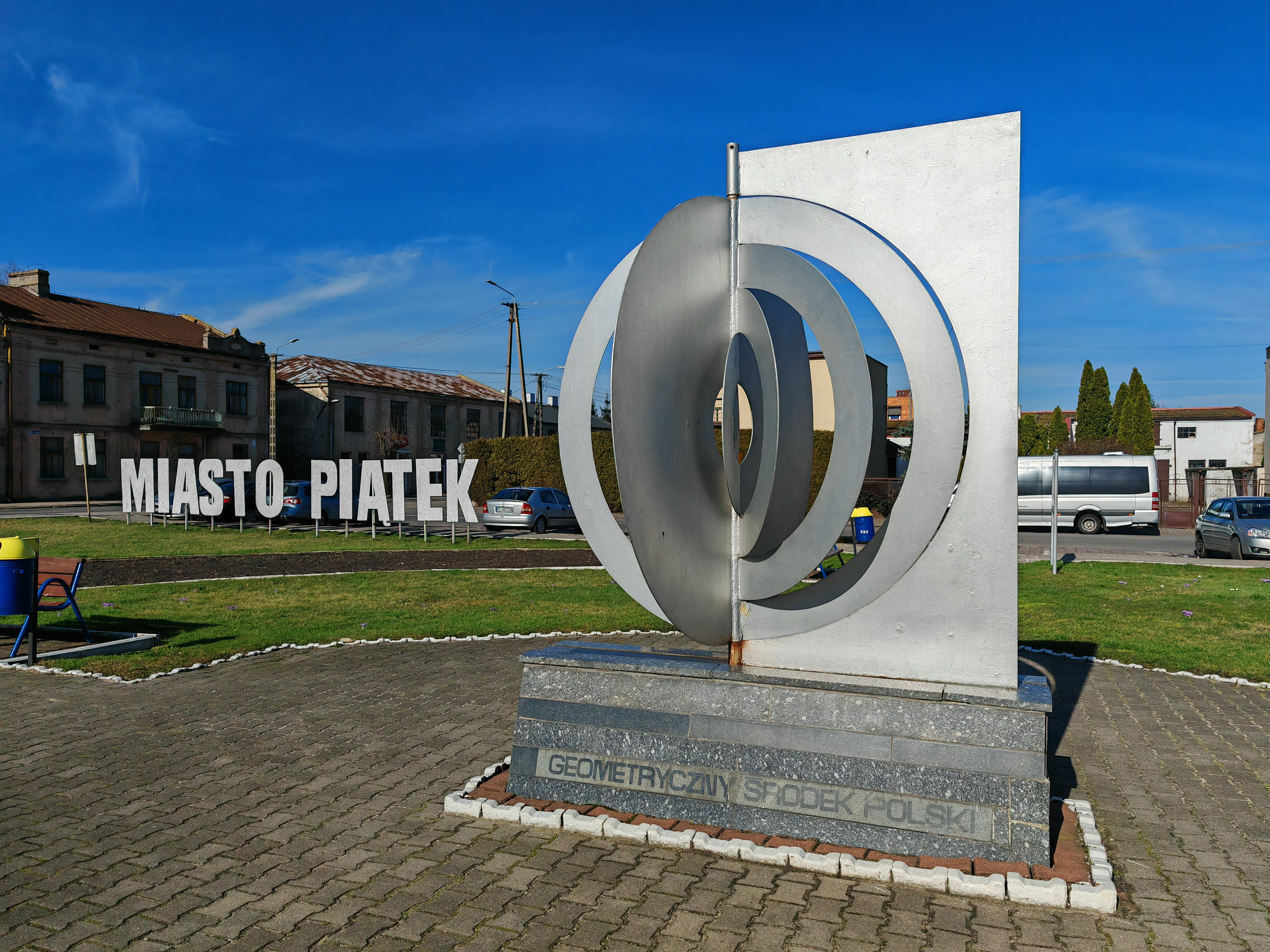
- Sculpture in Piątek marking the "geometrical centre" of Poland.

- Location within Poland
- Coordinates: 52°4′9″N 19°28′50″E
- Country: Poland
- Voivodeship: Łódź
- County: Łęczyca
- Gmina: Piątek
- Town rights: before 1339

Population (31 December 2020)
  - Total: 1,690 ▼
- Time zone: UTC+1 (CET)
  - Summer (DST): UTC+2 (CEST)
- Vehicle registration: ELE

Piątek [ˈpjɔntɛk] is a town in Łęczyca County, Łódź Voivodeship, in central Poland. It is the seat of the gmina (administrative district) called Gmina Piątek. It lies approximately 20 km (12 mi) east of Łęczyca and 32 km (20 mi) north of the regional capital Łódź. It is located in the historic Łęczyca Land.

The town has a population of 1,690. It is claimed to lie at the "geometrical centre" of Poland, although it is not the true geographical centre – it is the centre determined as the intersection of the great circle diagonals of a rectangle formed by lines of latitude and longitude passing through the four extreme points of Poland.

== History ==
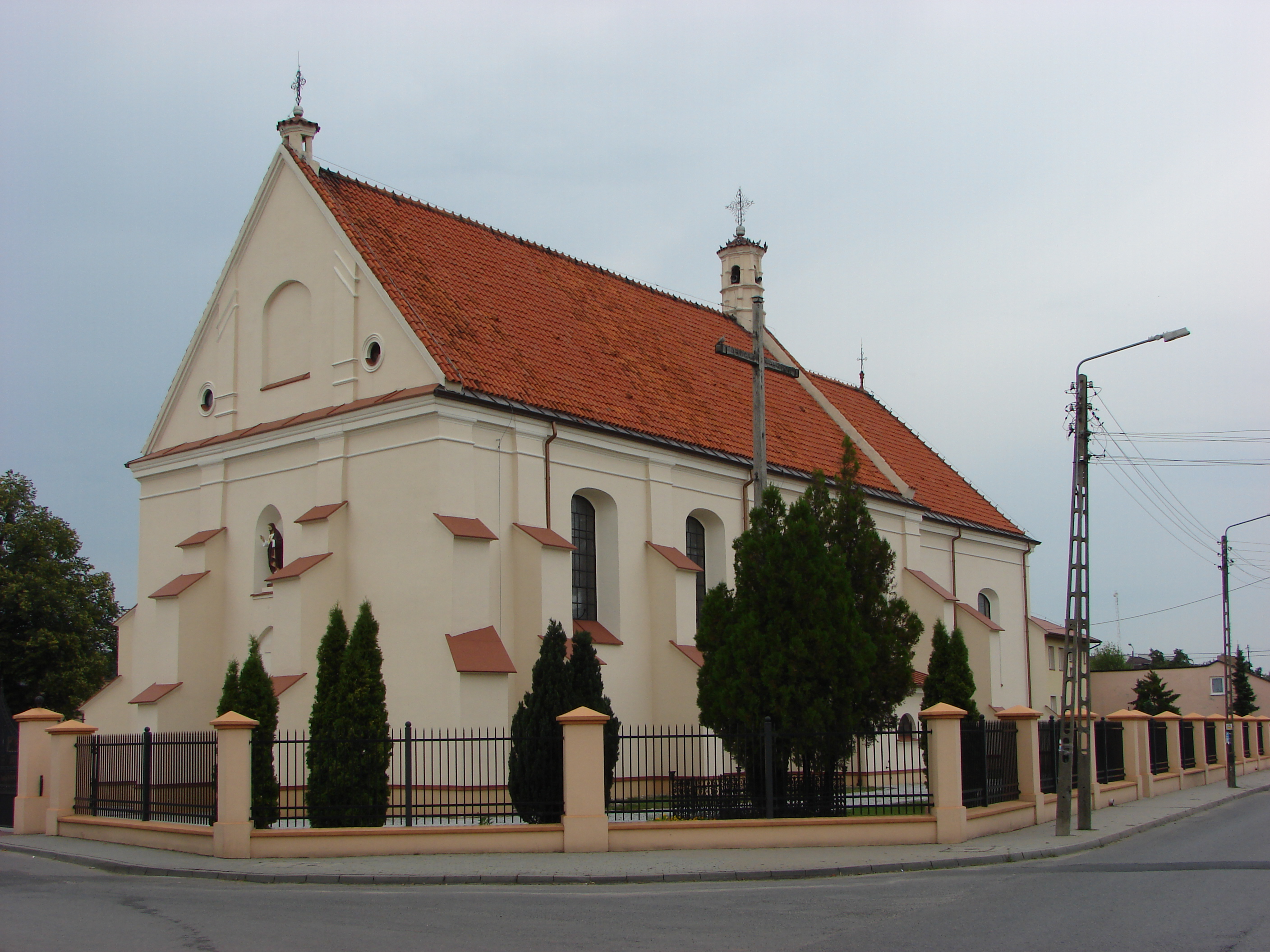
Holy Trinity church, built in the 15th century

The name Piątek, Polish for "Friday", comes from the day on which the weekly market was held. Piątek was granted town rights before 1339. It was a private church town administratively located in the Łęczyca County in the Łęczyca Voivodeship in the Greater Poland Province of the Kingdom of Poland. One of two main routes connecting Warsaw and Dresden ran through the town in the 18th century and Kings Augustus II the Strong and Augustus III of Poland often traveled that route.

In the interwar period, it was administratively located in the Łódź Voivodeship of Poland. In the 1921 census, 69.0% of the population declared Polish nationality and 30.9% declared Jewish nationality.

During the German Invasion of Poland, which started World War II in 1939, Wehrmacht soldiers on 13 September took 50 males (43 Poles and 7 Jews) out of homes and ordered them to repair a damaged bridge. After the work was completed the German soldiers shot all of them. Another massacre took place later in which 50 Jews were executed.

Before the war around 1,300 Jews lived in Piątek. Under German occupation, already in September 1939, a few hundred fled. In late 1940, the remaining 840 Jews were confined to a ghetto and stripped of their possessions. Many Jews in the Piątek ghetto died of starvation and disease due to limited food and severe overcrowding. In 1941, hundreds were taken to forced labour camps. In 1942, German police began randomly shooting Jews and in August 1942 rounded them up and shot those who were ill and elderly in the local cemetery. Others were sent to the Łódź Ghetto. Most were sent to the Chełmno extermination camp where they were immediately gassed. Only a few of Piątek's Jews survived the war.

== Points of interest ==
The most precious cultural heritage monument is the Gothic-Baroque church of the Holy Trinity, which dates back to the 15th century. Other historic structures include the Mariavite Church and the Park Miejski ("Municipal Park").

== Transport ==
The A1 motorway, connecting Gdańsk and Toruń in the north with Częstochowa, the Katowice urban area and the Czech Republic–Poland border at Gorzyczki in the south, bypasses the town in the east.
