= Radziejewo, Warmian-Masurian Voivodeship =

Radziejewo
- Village
- Location within Poland
- Coordinates: 54°13′N 20°12′E
- Country: Poland
- Voivodeship: Warmian-Masurian
- County: Braniewo
- Gmina: Pieniężno

Radziejewo [rad͡ʑɛˈjɛvɔ] is a village in the administrative district of Gmina Pieniężno, within Braniewo County, Warmian-Masurian Voivodeship, in northern Poland.
