= Balków =

- Village
- Location within Poland
- Coordinates: 52°5′N 19°24′E
- Country: Poland
- Voivodeship: Łódź
- County: Łęczyca
- Gmina: Piątek
- Population: 420

Balków [ˈbalkuf] is a village in the administrative district of Gmina Piątek, within Łęczyca County, Łódź Voivodeship, in central Poland.
