= Dorohusk =

- Village
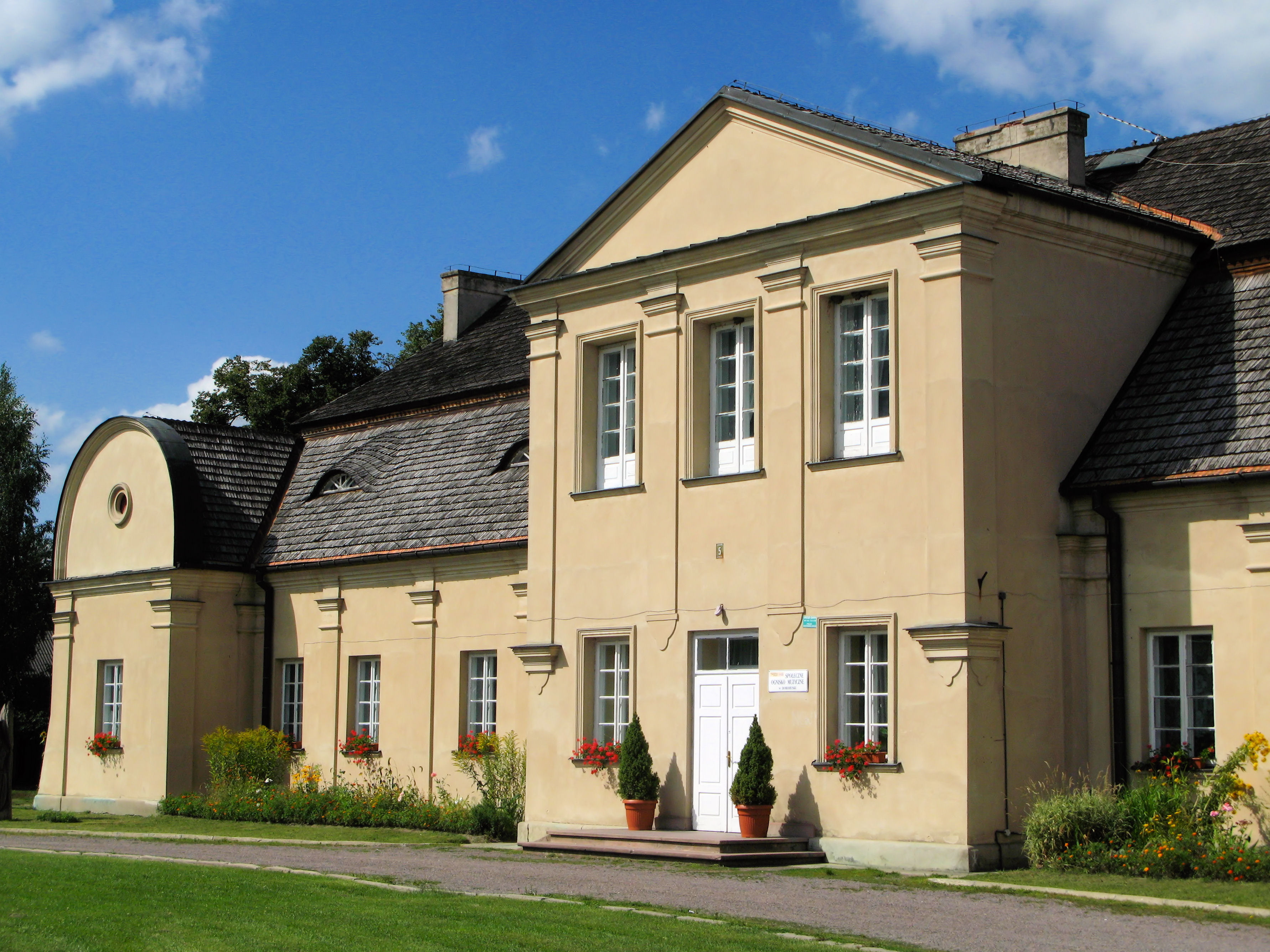
- Suchodolski Palace, 18th century

- Location within Poland
- Coordinates: 51°10′N 23°49′E
- Country: Poland
- Voivodeship: Lublin
- County: Chełm
- Gmina: Dorohusk

Population
  - Total: 517
- Time zone: UTC+1 (CET)
  - Summer (DST): UTC+2 (CEST)
- Vehicle registration: LCH

Dorohusk (Polish: [dɔˈrɔxusk]; Ukrainian: Дорогуськ [doroˈɦusʲk]) is a village in Chełm County, Lublin Voivodeship, in southeastern Poland, at the border with Ukraine. It is the seat of Gmina Dorohusk (administrative district).

The landmark of Dorohusk is the Suchodolski Palace, a Baroque palace built by the Suchodolski family in the 18th century.
