= Kępa, Chełm County =

Kępa
- Village
- Location within Poland
- Coordinates: 51°10′41″N 23°36′48″E
- Country: Poland
- Voivodeship: Lublin
- County: Chełm
- Gmina: Dorohusk

Kępa [ˈkɛmpa] is a village in the administrative district of Gmina Dorohusk, within Chełm County, Lublin Voivodeship, in eastern Poland, close to the border with Ukraine.
