= Łęka, Gmina Piątek =

Łęka
- Village
- Location within Poland
- Coordinates: 52°03′54″N 19°29′44″E
- Country: Poland
- Voivodeship: Łódź
- County: Łęczyca
- Gmina: Piątek

Łęka [ˈwɛnka] is a village in the administrative district of Gmina Piątek, within Łęczyca County, Łódź Voivodeship, in central Poland.
