= Sypin =

- Village
- Location within Poland
- Coordinates: 52°1′N 19°27′E
- Country: Poland
- Voivodeship: Łódź
- County: Łęczyca
- Gmina: Piątek

Sypin [ˈsɨpin] is a village in the administrative district of Gmina Piątek, within Łęczyca County, Łódź Voivodeship, in central Poland.
