= Niedbałki =

- Village
- Location within Poland
- Coordinates: 54°12′30″N 20°18′21″E
- Country: Poland
- Voivodeship: Warmian-Masurian
- County: Braniewo
- Gmina: Pieniężno

Niedbałki [ɲɛdˈbau̯ki] is a village in the administrative district of Gmina Pieniężno, within Braniewo County, Warmian-Masurian Voivodeship, in northern Poland.
