= Borovec =

Borovec may refer to:

In Bulgaria:

- Borovets, a mountain resort situated in the Province of Sofia

In Macedonia:

- Borovec (Struga), a village near Struga

In Slovenia:

- Borovec pri Kočevski Reki, a settlement in the Municipality of Kočevje
- Borovec pri Karlovici, a settlement in the Municipality of Velike Lašče

== See also ==
- Borowiec
