= Nenad Borovčanin =

Serbian boxer (born 1979)

Personal information
- Nicknames: Nešo; Neša
- Nationality: Serbian
- Born: 25 March 1979 (age 47) Loznica, SFR Yugoslavia
- Height: 1.89 m (6 ft 2 in)
- Weight: Cruiserweight

Boxing career
- Stance: Southpaw

Boxing record
- Total fights: 30
- Wins: 30
- Win by KO: 21
- Losses: 0
- Draws: 0

Nenad Borovčanin (Serbian Cyrillic: Ненад Боровчанин; born 25 March 1979) is a Serbian boxer.

He held the Interim WBO European Cruiserweight title from 11 June 2011 to 2012. His head coach is Miroslav Borovčanin (since 2006.).

== Life after boxing ==
After his match against Varol Vekiloglu, Borovčanin seems to have retired from boxing but remained to be a part of Serbian boxing, on BoxRec, he can be seen having a promoter page and he promoted 3 events, ranging from June 2016 to September 2017, other than that, he became a politician and a member of Executive Board at EUBC according to his Facebook profiles.

== Professional boxing record ==
30 fights	30 wins	0 losses
By knockout	21	0
By decision	9	0

No.	Result	Record	Opponent	Type	Round, Time	Date	Location	Notes
30	Win	30–0	(Germany) Varol Vekiloglu	RTD	7 (12), 3:00	4 May 2012	Hala Lagator, Loznica, Serbia	Retained WBO European Interim cruiserweight title
29	Win	29–0	(Germany) Lars Buchholz	TKO	8 (12), 2:23	23 Dec 2011	Novi Sad, Serbia	Retained WBO European Interim cruiserweight title
28	Win	28–0	(Bulgaria) Konstantin Semerdjiev	UD	12	11 Jun 2011	Hala Borik, Banja Luka, Bosnia and Herzegovina	Won vacant WBO European Interim cruiserweight title
27	Win	27–0	(Austria) Patrick Berger	TKO	1 (6), 2:28	16 Oct 2010	O2 World Arena, Altona, Germany	
26	Win	26–0	(Kenya) Raymond Ochieng	UD	6	29 May 2010	Veltins Arena, Gelsenkirchen, Germany	
25	Win	25–0	(Democratic Republic of the Congo) Jonathan Pasi	TKO	2 (4)	20 Mar 2010	ESPRIT Arena, Düsseldorf, Germany	
24	Win	24–0	(Ukraine) Igor Pylypenko	TKO	3 (8)	4 Mar 2010	Grand Hotel, Kopaonik, Serbia	
23	Win	23–0	(Germany) Andreas Guenther	PTS	6	23 Jan 2010	Wai Tai, Zlatibor, Serbia	
22	Win	22–0	(Germany) Sven Haselhuhn	UD	6	12 Dec 2009	PostFinance Arena, Bern, Switzerland	
21	Win	21–0	(Bosnia and Herzegovina) Adis Dadovic	TKO	3 (6)	28 Nov 2009	Hall Prokleta Avlija, Drvengrad, Serbia	
20	Win	20–0	(Germany) Muhammed Ali Durmaz	TKO	2 (6)	24 Jul 2009	Bazen Rondo, Budva, Montenegro	
19	Win	19–0	(Germany) Werner Kreiskott	UD	6	16 Apr 2009	Podgorica, Montenegro	
18	Win	18–0	(Bosnia and Herzegovina) Sanid Imamovic	KO	2 (6), 1:43	26 Dec 2008	Hala Spens, Novi Sad, Serbia	
17	Win	17–0	(Germany) Muhammed Ali Durmaz	KO	4 (12)	26 Sep 2008	Zvornik, Bosnia and Herzegovina	
16	Win	16–0	(Hungary) Gyorgy Mihalik	TKO	2 (10), 2:30	1 Aug 2008	Budva, Montenegro	
15	Win	15–0	(Hungary) Janos Somogyi	TKO	3 (6)	18 Apr 2008	Mostar, Bosnia and Herzegovina	
14	Win	14–0	(Germany) Mustafa Erenay	TKO	1 (4)	21 Dec 2007	Alabama Hall, Munich, Germany	
13	Win	13–0	(Slovakia) Vlado Szabo	PTS	6	26 Apr 2007	Spens, Novi Sad, Serbia	
12	Win	12–0	(Slovakia) Peter Simko	KO	2 (10), 2:04	10 Mar 2007	Hala Zdravlje, Leskovac, Serbia	
11	Win	11–0	(Latvia) Janis Gracinskis	TKO	1 (6)	14 Oct 2006	Hala Borik, Dvorana Borik, Bosnia and Herzegovina	
10	Win	10–0	(Slovakia) Stefan Kusnier	TKO	2 (6), 2:49	15 Jul 2006	Bazen Rondo, Budva, Montenegro	
9	Win	9–0	(Bosnia and Herzegovina) Adnan Buharalija	PTS	6	16 Mar 2006	Hala Spens, Novi Sad, Serbia and Montenegro	
8	Win	8–0	(Bosnia and Herzegovina) Adnan Buharalija	KO	5 (6)	29 Dec 2005	Zvornik, Bosnia and Herzegovina	
7	Win	7–0	(Croatia) Ante Lovric	KO	2 (4)	5 Aug 2005	Budva, Serbia and Montenegro	
6	Win	6–0	(Bulgaria) Georgi Hristov	KO	3 (6)	3 Jun 2005	Smederevo, Serbia and Montenegro	
5	Win	5–0	(Hungary) Sandor Forgacs	KO	2 (4)	28 Apr 2005	Banja Luka, Bosnia and Herzegovina	
4	Win	4–0	(Bulgaria) Georgi Hristov	TKO	3 (4)	30 Oct 2004	Banja Luka, Bosnia and Herzegovina	
3	Win	3–0	(Serbia and Montenegro) Dusan Pasic	TKO	3 (4)	5 Oct 2004	Sky Bar, Belgrade, Serbia and Montenegro	
2	Win	2–0	(Montenegro) Branko Gacevic	UD	4	19 Jun 2004	Aleksandrovac, Serbia and Montenegro	
1	Win	1–0	(Croatia) Sinisa Puljak	PTS	4	5 Jun 2004	Belgrade, Serbia and Montenegro	
