= Kolonia, Braniewo County =

Kolonia
- Settlement
- Location within Poland
- Coordinates: 54°12′38″N 20°05′50″E
- Country: Poland
- Voivodeship: Warmian-Masurian
- County: Braniewo
- Gmina: Pieniężno

Kolonia [kɔˈlɔɲa] is a settlement in the administrative district of Gmina Pieniężno, within Braniewo County, Warmian-Masurian Voivodeship, in northern Poland.
