= Borowiec, Łęczyca County =

Borowiec
- Village
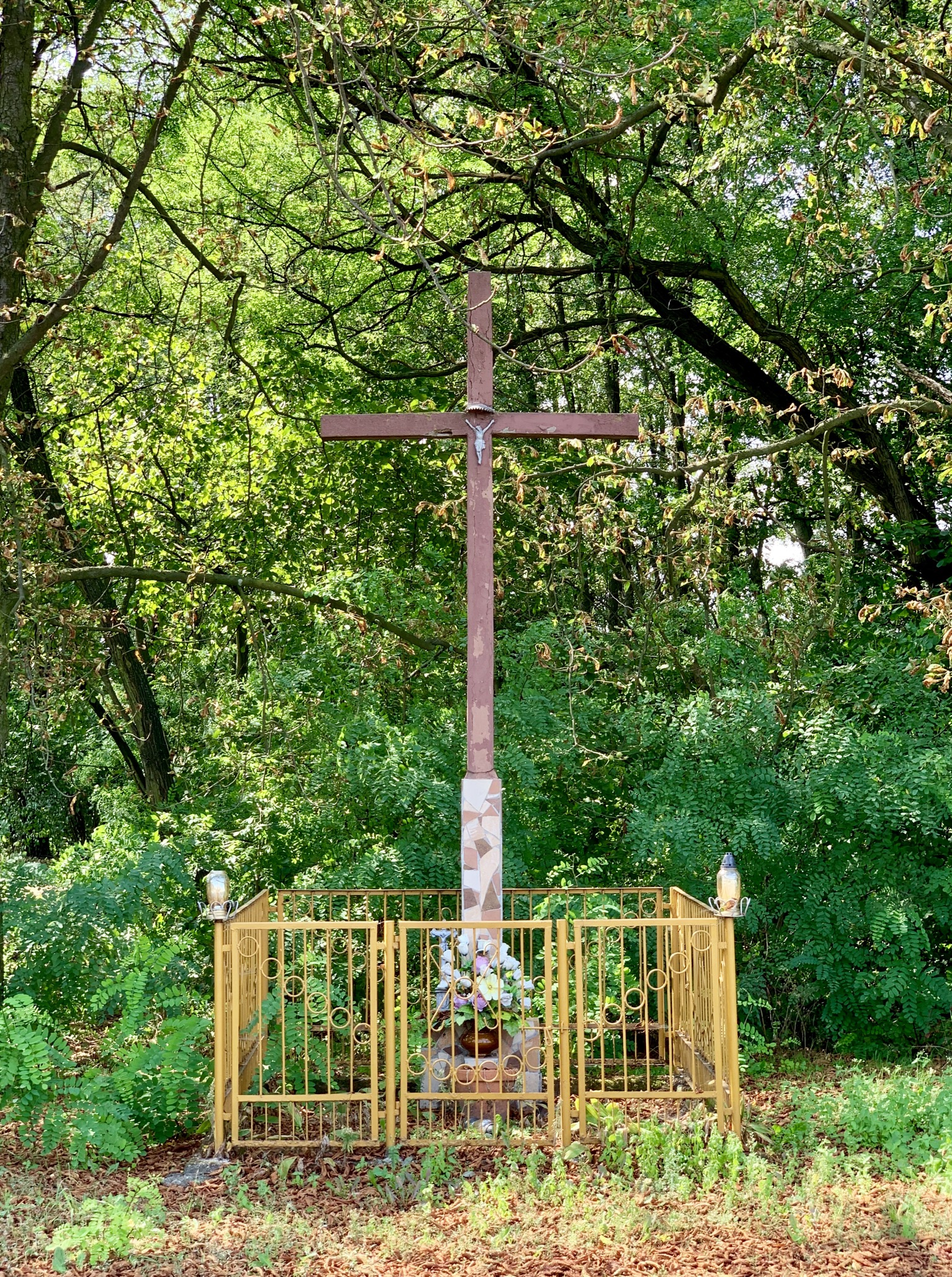
- Wayside cross

- Location within Poland
- Coordinates: 52°0′28″N 19°26′41″E
- Country: Poland
- Voivodeship: Łódź
- County: Łęczyca
- Gmina: Piątek
- Population: 60

Borowiec [bɔˈrɔvjɛt͡s] is a village in the administrative district of Gmina Piątek, within Łęczyca County, Łódź Voivodeship, in central Poland.
