= Włostowice, Łódź Voivodeship =

Włostowice
- Village
- Location within Poland
- Coordinates: 52°7′N 19°29′E
- Country: Poland
- Voivodeship: Łódź
- County: Łęczyca
- Gmina: Piątek

Włostowice [vwɔstɔˈvit͡sɛ] is a village in the administrative district of Gmina Piątek, within Łęczyca County, Łódź Voivodeship, in central Poland.
