= Jasionna, Łęczyca County =

Jasionna
- Village
- Location within Poland
- Coordinates: 52°02′07″N 19°33′17″E
- Country: Poland
- Voivodeship: Łódź
- County: Łęczyca
- Gmina: Piątek

Jasionna [jaˈɕɔnna] is a village in the administrative district of Gmina Piątek, within Łęczyca County, Łódź Voivodeship, in central Poland.
