= Michałówka, Chełm County =

Michałówka
- Village
- Location within Poland
- Coordinates: 51°7′14″N 23°46′28″E
- Country: Poland
- Voivodeship: Lublin
- County: Chełm
- Gmina: Dorohusk

Population
  - Total: 230

Michałówka [mixaˈwufka] is a village in the administrative district of Gmina Dorohusk, within Chełm County, Lublin Voivodeship, in eastern Poland, close to the border with Ukraine.

In 2005 the village had a population of 230.
