= Pieniężno =

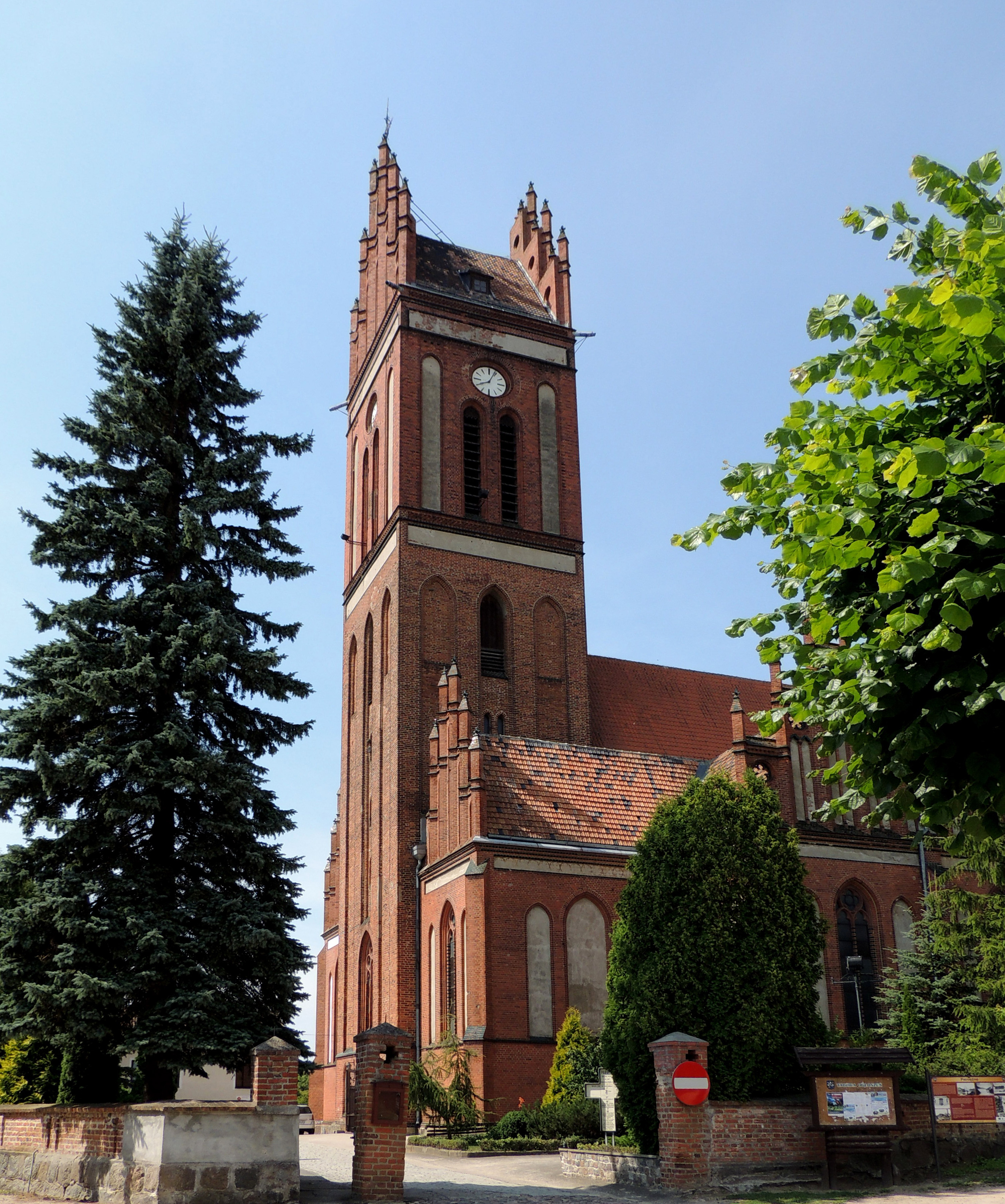
- Saints Peter and Paul church in Pieniężno

- Flag Coat of arms
- Interactive map of Pieniężno
- Location within Poland
- Coordinates: 54°13′N 20°7′E
- Country: Poland
- Voivodeship: Warmian-Masurian
- County: Braniewo
- Gmina: Pieniężno

Area
  - Total: 3.83 km^{2} (1.48 sq mi)

Population (2010)
  - Total: 2,801
  - Density: 731/km^{2} (1,890/sq mi)
- Time zone: UTC+1 (CET)
  - Summer (DST): UTC+2 (CEST)
- Postal code: 14-520
- Vehicle registration: NBR
- Website: www.pieniezno.pl

Pieniężno (Polish pronunciation: [pʲɛˈɲɛ̃ʐnɔ]; former Polish: Melzak; German: Mehlsack [ˈmeːlˌzak]) is a town in northern Poland, located on the Wałsza River in Warmia, in the Warmian-Masurian Voivodeship. It is located in Braniewo County and had a population of 2,801 in 2010.

== History ==
=== Middle Ages ===
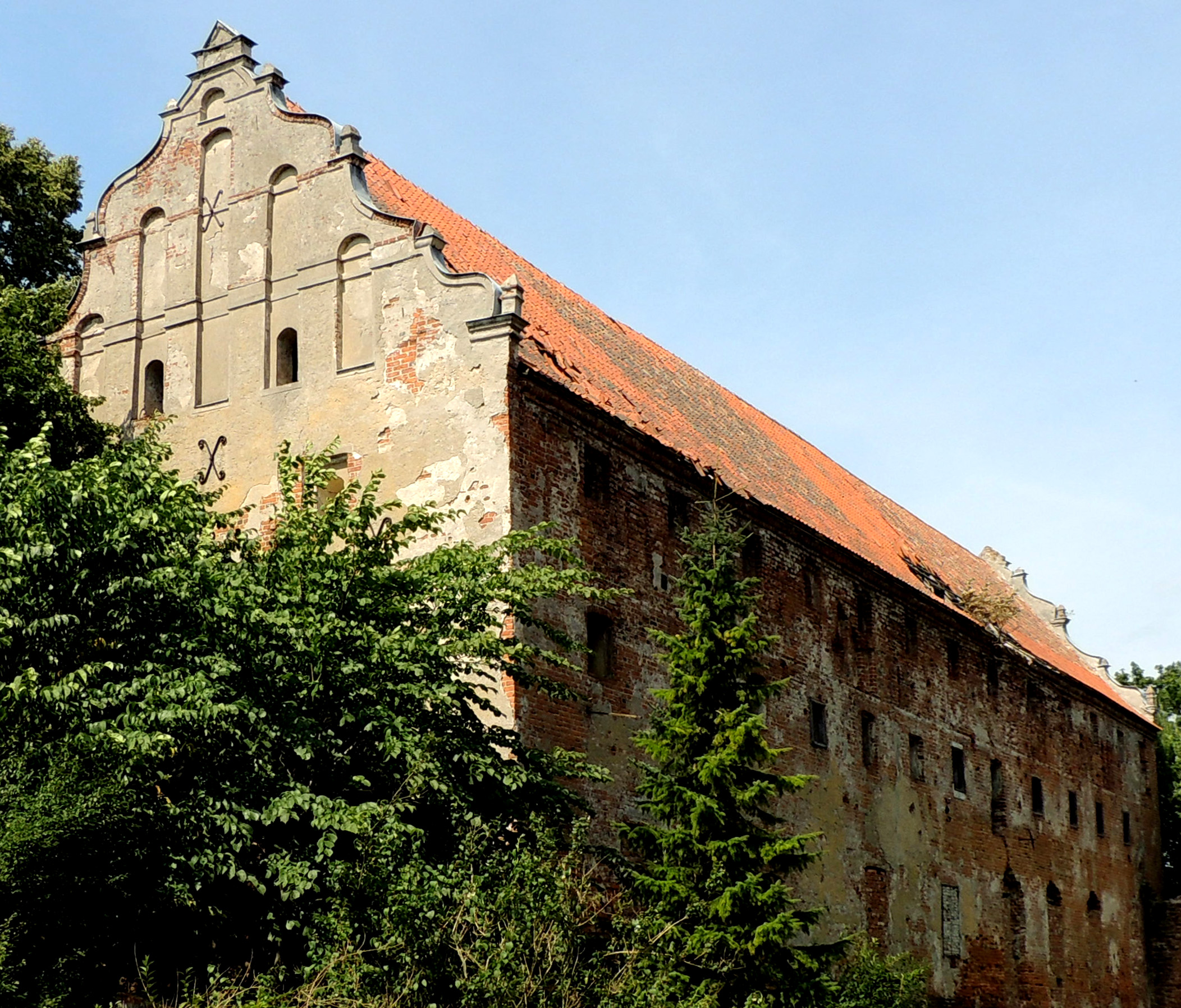
Pieniężno Castle, Nicolaus Copernicus' home in 1518-19

During the Middle Ages, an Old Prussian fort called Malcekuke, loosely translated as "woods of the subterraneous" or "devil's ground", was located near the current site of Pieniężno. This was linguistically corrupted by German settlers to Mehlsack, meaning "flour sack", and then by Poles to Melzak. In the 14th century it was founded as a town west of Heilsberg (Lidzbark) in Warmia.

The town's coat of arms depicts three bags of flour spaced in between a golden sword and a silver key, all on a blue background. The website recalls a story that the inhabitants defied a Swedish siege in the 17th century by spilling their last sack of flour as a deception to convince them that they still had plenty of food left.

The Teutonic Knights built an Ordensburg castle near Malcekuke in 1302. Dutchman Frederick from Pasłęk became the lokator and mayor of the town, and Dutch people from Pasłęk were probably its first settlers. Both the castle and the town which developed nearby were destroyed during warfare between the Teutonic Order and the Kingdom of Poland in 1414. In 1440, the town joined the anti-Teutonic Prussian Confederation, upon the request of which it was incorporated to Poland by King Casimir IV Jagiellon in 1454. During the subsequent Thirteen Years' War, Mehlsack surrendered to the Order, and the castle burned down during Poland's recapture of the town. In 1466, the town was recaptured by Poles led by Jan Skalski, then unsuccessfully besieged by the Teutonic Knights, and with the end of the war in 1466, Melzak decisively passed to Poland.

=== Modern era ===
Nicolaus Copernicus was an administrator for the districts of Olsztyn and Melzak for a few years in the early 16th century. From October 1518 to March 1519 Copernicus was based out of the castle while he settled nearby villages. In 1520, the town was captured by the Teutonic Knights during the last Polish–Teutonic War. From 1589-1599, Prince Andrew Cardinal Báthory of Transylvania, nephew of Polish King Stephen Báthory, was the administrator for the castle.

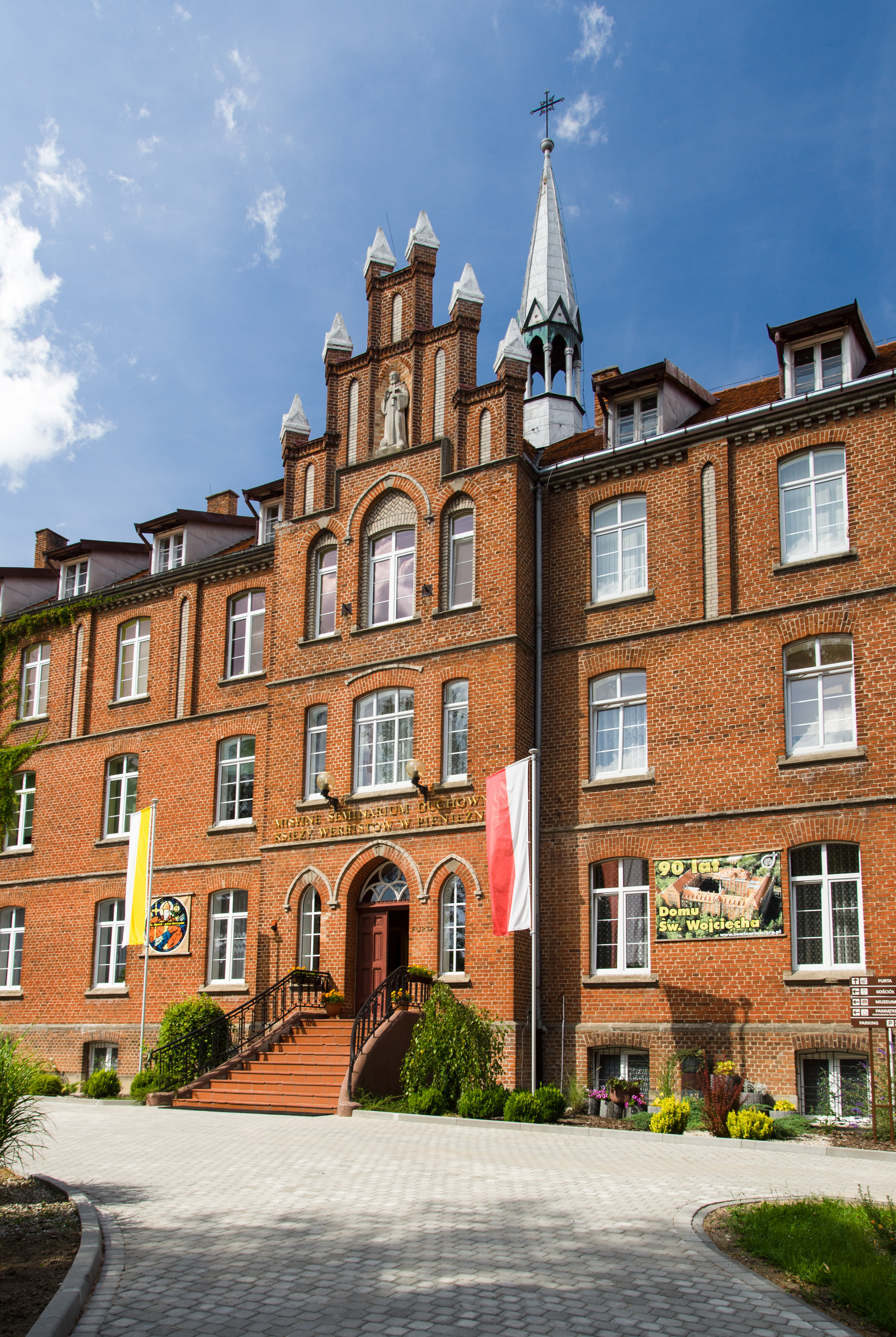
Historical seminary

The town was captured by Swedish troops in 1626 during the Polish-Swedish War of 1625-29, recovered by Hetman Stanisław Rewera Potocki, and then had its castle partially destroyed by Swedish troops in 1627. The town hall, dating from the 14th century and rebuilt in the 15th century, was destroyed during the Swedish occupation in 1626. It was rebuilt in 1666, but burnt in a fire the same year, only to be rebuilt again in 1770. The castle was restyled in 1640 with Baroque gables, and its function changed from being a fortress to being a château.

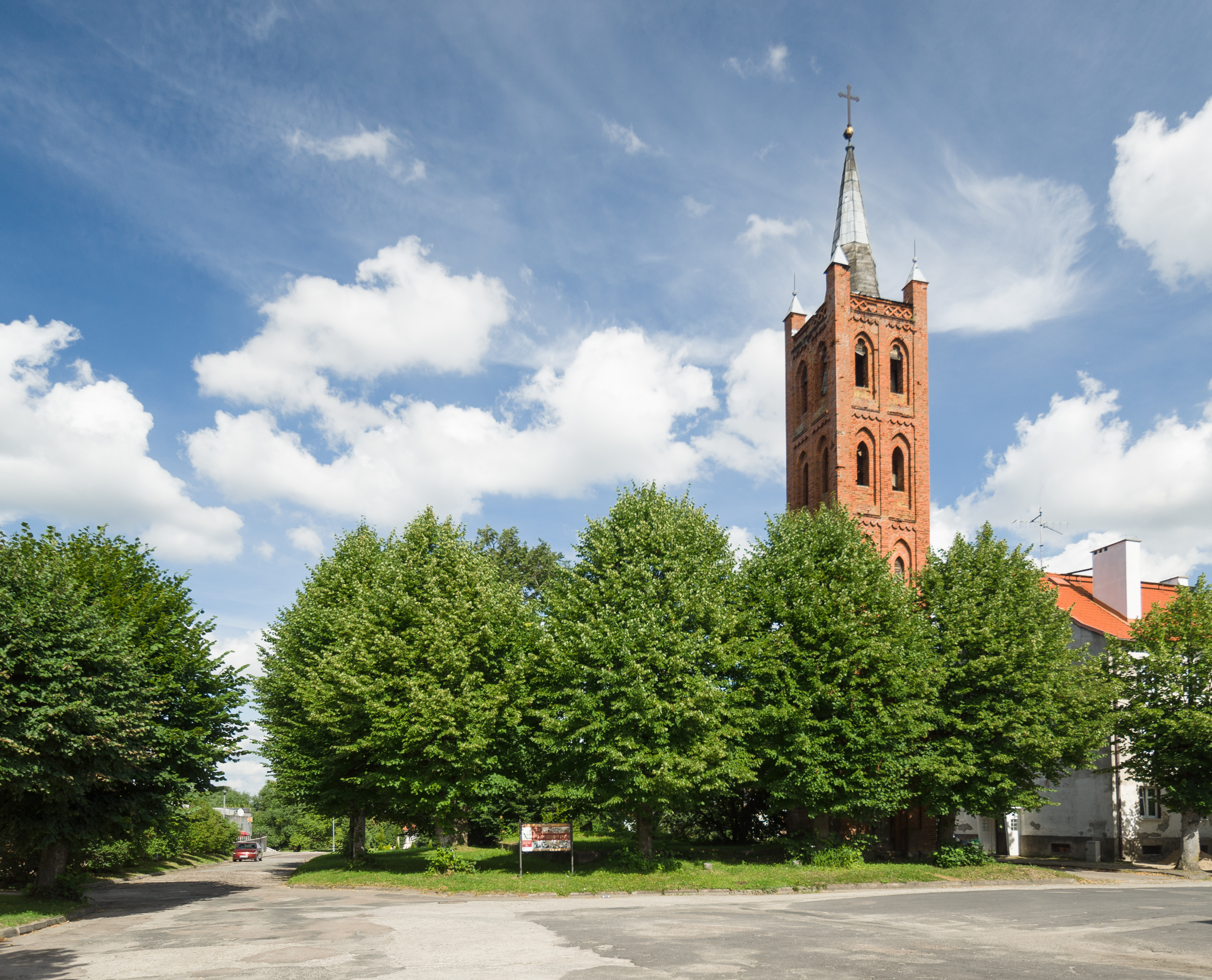
Tower of the former Lutheran church

The town was annexed by the Kingdom of Prussia during the First Partition of Poland in 1772, and administered in the Province of East Prussia the following year. It became part of the German Empire in 1871 during the Prussian-led unification of Germany.

During the 19th and 20th centuries the castle lost some of its Gothic and Baroque features, and in 1870 its eastern and southern wings were demolished after extensive deterioration. The remainder of the castle was used as administrative offices for Prussian officials. From 1920-31 the western wing was renovated so the castle could be used as a school and museum.

In 1945, near the end of World War II, Mehlsack, including its castle, was mostly destroyed by the war and was occupied by the Soviet Red Army and the youngest-ever Soviet General, Ivan Chernyakhovsky, died in the area. After German surrender, sovereignty over the town was ceremoniously transferred to Polish authorities on August 11, 1945, by the Soviets. The town later fell within the newly redrawn borders of Poland under the terms of the Potsdam Agreement.

The town was renamed from Mehlsack to Pieniężno after Seweryn Pieniężny (1890–1940), an editor for the Polish-language newspaper Gazeta Olsztyńska in Olsztyn, imprisoned and murdered by the Germans during World War II.

== Demographics ==
Historical population
Year	Pop.	±%
1871	3,734	—
1880	3,760	+0.7%
1890	3,937	+4.7%
1900	4,152	+5.5%
1910	3,913	−5.8%
1925	4,271	+9.1%
1950	944	−77.9%
1960	1,730	+83.3%
2010	2,801	+61.9%

== Transport ==
Vovoideship road 507 bypasses Pieniężno to the east.

Pieniężno has a station on the Braniewo-Olsztyn railway line.
