= Michałówka, Łódź Voivodeship =

Michałówka
- Village
- Location within Poland
- Coordinates: 52°5′41″N 19°28′50″E
- Country: Poland
- Voivodeship: Łódź
- County: Łęczyca
- Gmina: Piątek
- Population: 58

Michałówka [mixaˈwufka] is a village in the administrative district of Gmina Piątek, within Łęczyca County, Łódź Voivodeship, in central Poland.

In 2005 the village had a population of 58.
