= Glądy, Braniewo County =

Glądy
- Village
- Location within Poland
- Coordinates: 54°14′19″N 20°16′19″E
- Country: Poland
- Voivodeship: Warmian-Masurian
- County: Braniewo
- Gmina: Pieniężno

Glądy [ˈɡlɔndɨ] is a village in the administrative district of Gmina Pieniężno, within Braniewo County, Warmian-Masurian Voivodeship, in northern Poland.
