= Borovac (Rogatica) =

Borovac Боровац
- Village
- Location within Bosnia and Herzegovina
- Coordinates: 43°58′50″N 19°06′23″E
- Country: Bosnia and Herzegovina
- Entity: Republika Srpska
- Municipality: Rogatica
- Time zone: UTC+1 (CET)
  - Summer (DST): UTC+2 (CEST)

Borovac (Serbian Cyrillic: Боровац) is a village in the Republika Srpska, Bosnia and Herzegovina. According to the 1991 census it is in the municipality of Rogatica.

It serves as an administrative and cultural hub in its part of Bosnia. Borovac is at latitude 43.9750° N and longitude 19.1038° E.

== Demography ==
The region is predominantly populated by ethnic Serbs, with the municipality having a mix of Bosniak and other minority communities
