= Witów, Łęczyca County =

Witów
- Village
- Location within Poland
- Coordinates: 52°2′N 19°32′E
- Country: Poland
- Voivodeship: Łódź
- County: Łęczyca
- Gmina: Piątek

Witów [ˈvituf] is a village in the administrative district of Gmina Piątek, within Łęczyca County, Łódź Voivodeship, in central Poland.
