= Janówek, Łęczyca County =

Janówek
- Village
- Location within Poland
- Coordinates: 52°4′16″N 19°24′53″E
- Country: Poland
- Voivodeship: Łódź
- County: Łęczyca
- Gmina: Piątek

Janówek [jaˈnuvɛk] is a village in the administrative district of Gmina Piątek, within Łęczyca County, Łódź Voivodeship, in central Poland.
