= Okopy-Kolonia =

- Colony
- Location within Poland
- Coordinates: 51°10′38″N 23°45′35″E
- Country: Poland
- Voivodeship: Lublin
- County: Chełm
- Gmina: Dorohusk

Okopy-Kolonia [ɔˈkɔpɨ kɔˈlɔɲa] is a colony in the administrative district of Gmina Dorohusk, within Chełm County, Lublin Voivodeship, in eastern Poland, close to the border with Ukraine.
