= Świerże, Chełm County =

Village in Poland

Świerże
- Village

- Location within Poland
- Coordinates: 51°13′N 23°44′E
- Country: Poland
- Voivodeship: Lublin
- County: Chełm
- Gmina: Dorohusk

Population
  - Total: 990
- SIMC: 0102924

Świerże (Polish pronunciation: [ˈɕfjɛrʐɛ]) is a village in the administrative district of Gmina Dorohusk, within Chełm County, Lublin Voivodeship, in eastern Poland, close to the border with Ukraine.

The Jewish population of the town numbered at least 800 Jews upon the outbreak of World War II. In October 1942, the Jews from Świerże were forced to walk to the Sobibór extermination camp, a distance of 40 km (25 mi). The Jews of Świerże were all murdered.
