= Łubnica, Łódź Voivodeship =

Łubnica
- Village
- Location within Poland
- Coordinates: 52°3′N 19°25′E
- Country: Poland
- Voivodeship: Łódź
- County: Łęczyca
- Gmina: Piątek

Łubnica [wubˈnit͡sa] is a village in the administrative district of Gmina Piątek, within Łęczyca County, Łódź Voivodeship, in central Poland.
