= Topola (disambiguation) =

Topola may refer to the following places:

Serbia

- Topola, Šumadija district
- Bačka Topola, North Bačka district, Vojvodina
- Banatska Topola, North Banat district

Poland

- Greater Poland Voivodeship:
  - Topola, Piła County
  - Topola, Gmina Środa Wielkopolska, Środa County
- Topola, Lower Silesian Voivodeship
- Topola, Lublin Voivodeship
- Topola, Kuyavian-Pomeranian Voivodeship
- Świętokrzyskie Voivodeship:
  - Topola, Busko County
  - Topola, Kazimierza County

Slovakia

- Topoľa

Bulgaria

- Topola, Dobrich Province

== See also ==
Other Polish places

- Topola Katowa
- Topola Królewska
- Topola Mała
- Topola Szlachecka
- Topola Wielka
- Topola-Osiedle
- Miedniewice-Topola

Derivatives

- Nova Topola (disambiguation)

Similar spellings (same word roots)

- Topol (disambiguation)
- Topla (disambiguation)
