= Kosin =

Kosin may refer to:

== Places ==
=== Czech Republic ===
- Košín, a municipality and village in the Czech Republic

=== Poland ===
- Kosin, Łódź Voivodeship (central Poland)
- Kosin, Lublin Voivodeship (east Poland)
- Kosin, Lubusz Voivodeship (west Poland)
- Kosin, Drawsko County in West Pomeranian Voivodeship (north-west Poland)
- Kosin, Pyrzyce County in West Pomeranian Voivodeship (north-west Poland)

== People ==
- Kosin Hembut (born 1982), Thai footballer
- Phil Kosin (1950–2009), American journalist
- Yuri Kosin (1948–2022), Ukrainian photographer

== Other uses ==
- Kosin University, a university in Busan, South Korea
