= Witold Zglenicki =

Polish geologist and philanthropist

Witold Zglenicki Витольд Згленицкий
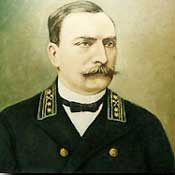
- Born: June 1, 1850; Stara Wargawa near Kutno, Russian Empire (now Poland)
- Died: July 6, 1904 (aged 54); Baku, Russian Empire (now Azerbaijan)
- Resting place: Wola Kiełpińska near Warsaw, Russian Empire (now Poland)
- Education: Warsaw Main School; Mining Institute in Petersburg
- Occupation: geologist
- Known for: explorer of rich oil pools in the Caucasus pioneer of oil extracting from the bottom of the sea
- Awards: Order of the Lion and the Sun

Witold Leon Julian Zglenicki (Russian: Витольд Згленицкий; January 6, 1850, in Stara Wargawa near Kutno – July 6, 1904, in Baku, buried in Wola Kiełpińska near Warsaw) was a Polish scientist, geologist, and philanthropist who worked in Azerbaijan. He was the first to propose extracting oil from the seabed of the Caspian Sea.

For Zglenicki's contributions, he was awarded the rank of Collegiate Assessor by Tsarist Russia and honored with the "Order of the Lion and the Sun" by Qajar Shah Mozaffar ad-Din Shah Qajar. After his death, he bequeathed his entire fortune to scientific and charitable funds. Due to his philanthropic activities, he was referred to as the "Polish Nobel."

The main philanthropist of Polish science - donor of the then Kasa im. Mianowskiego (liquidated in 1951, reactivated in 1991) and the University of Warsaw.

== Life ==
Vitold Zglenicki was born in 1850 in the village of Wargawa Stara, Mazovia Province, Poland. From 1859 to 1866, he studied at the Plock Governorate Gymnasium. In 1866, he entered the Warsaw School of Economics. He graduated from the Faculty of Mathematics and Physics of the Warsaw School of Economics in 1870 and the Saint Petersburg Mining Institute with honors in 1875. On July 5, 1875, he was assigned to work in a mine located in Suchedniów, Kielce Province. On May 15, 1876, he was appointed manager of a metallurgical plant in Mroczków. After working there for three years, he was promoted to the position of Titular Assessor on March 15, 1879, and later to Collegiate Assessor on August 12, 1883. In 1891, Vitold Zglenicki moved to Baku, where he began working as an expert at the Baku Expert Office. Due to his efficient work, he was promoted to the rank of Chamberlain in 1897 and to the civil rank of Collegiate Assessor in 1901.

After moving to Baku, Zglenicki focused not only on his professional work but also on modernizing methods of oil extraction.

Zglenicki developed not only the concept of the drilling platform but also several inventions to simplify drilling processes, such as a device for measuring the curvature of oil wells and technical solutions that allowed faster and deeper drilling. He identified the locations of several oil fields on the Caspian Sea floor. Although he proposed several ideas for extracting oil from the seabed, these proposals were not accepted.

In 1900, for his contributions, Zglenicki was awarded the "Order of the Lion and the Sun" by Qajar Shah Mozaffar ad-Din Shah Qajar. With his and the Rylski brothers' support, the Church of the Holy Virgin Mary was built in Baku in 1912. However, the church was demolished in 1938 following the April Soviet occupation. In 1901, Vitold Zglenicki was diagnosed with diabetes. As diabetes was incurable at that time, he prepared a will in 1904. He bequeathed the income from his oil fields to the "Józef Mianowski Fund," which supported Polish science, and other charitable organizations.

Zglenicki died from diabetes on July 6, 1904. His body was transported to Poland and buried in the Wola Kiełpińska Cemetery.

== Memory ==
For his contributions in Baku, Zglenicki earned the title of the "Polish Nobel."

In 1963, a street leading from the oil refinery to the city center in Płock, Poland, was named after Zglenicki.

Several films have been made about Zglenicki: "Caucasian Biography" by director Ryszard Badowski in 1973, "Vitold Zglenicki and Others" by Vladislav Wasilewski in 1988, and "Polish Nobel" by Adam Rogala in 2008.

In 1975, a statue of Zglenicki was erected in Płock at the request of the Płock Scientific Society. Since 1989, a gymnasium named after Vitold Zglenicki has been operating in Poland. In 2003, the "Vitold Zglenicki Scientific Fund" was established to support schools, universities, and research centers.

On June 13, 2012, to mark the 540th anniversary of diplomatic relations between Azerbaijan and Poland, a memorial plaque dedicated to Zglenicki was unveiled at the school named after him in Poland. The plaque was initiated by the Azerbaijani Embassy in Poland.

In 2024, the National Museum of History of Azerbaijan hosted the presentation of a book about Zglenicki titled "Polish Nobel", authored by Andrzej Jan Chodubski.

== Private life ==
Son: Anatol (1896–1960).

== Bibliography ==
- Andrzej Chodubski: Witold Zglenicki „Polski Nobel” 1850–1904, Płock 1984
- Andrzej Chodubski: Górnik, geolog. Witold Zglenicki (1850-1904) „Polski Nobel”, Płock 2011
