= Łęka-Kolonia =

- Village
- Location within Poland
- Coordinates: 52°04′43″N 19°05′00″E
- Country: Poland
- Voivodeship: Łódź
- County: Łęczyca
- Gmina: Łęczyca

Łęka-Kolonia [ˈwɛnka kɔˈlɔɲa] is a village in the administrative district of Gmina Łęczyca, within Łęczyca County, Łódź Voivodeship, in central Poland.
