= Budki Stare =

- Village
- Location within Poland
- Coordinates: 52°9′54″N 19°16′30″E
- Country: Poland
- Voivodeship: Łódź
- County: Łęczyca
- Gmina: Witonia
- Population: 110

Budki Stare [ˈbutki ˈstarɛ] is a village in the administrative district of Gmina Witonia, within Łęczyca County, Łódź Voivodeship, in central Poland.
