= Wilczkowice Dolne, Łódź Voivodeship =

Wilczkowice Dolne
- Village
- Location within Poland
- Coordinates: 52°3′12″N 19°8′55″E
- Country: Poland
- Voivodeship: Łódź
- County: Łęczyca
- Gmina: Łęczyca

Wilczkowice Dolne [vilt͡ʂkɔˈvit͡sɛ ˈdɔlnɛ] is a village in the administrative district of Gmina Łęczyca, within Łęczyca County, Łódź Voivodeship, in central Poland.
