= Wilczkowice Średnie =

- Village
- Location within Poland
- Coordinates: 52°2′36″N 19°9′30″E
- Country: Poland
- Voivodeship: Łódź
- County: Łęczyca
- Gmina: Łęczyca
- Population: 180

Wilczkowice Średnie [vilt͡ʂkɔˈvit͡sɛ ˈɕrɛdɲɛ] is a village in the administrative district of Gmina Łęczyca, within Łęczyca County, Łódź Voivodeship, in central Poland.
