= Leszcze =

Leszcze may refer to the following places:

- Leszcze, Kuyavian-Pomeranian Voivodeship (north-central Poland)
- Leszcze, Łódź Voivodeship (central Poland)
- Leszcze, Subcarpathian Voivodeship (south-east Poland)
- Leszcze, Świętokrzyskie Voivodeship (south-central Poland)
- Leszcze, Gmina Kłodawa in Greater Poland Voivodeship (central Poland)
- Leszcze, Gmina Kościelec in Greater Poland Voivodeship (central Poland)
