= Gledzianówek =

- Village
- Location within Poland
- Coordinates: 52°7′51″N 19°20′34″E
- Country: Poland
- Voivodeship: Łódź
- County: Łęczyca
- Gmina: Witonia

Gledzianówek [ɡlɛd͡ʑaˈnuvɛk] is a village in the administrative district of Gmina Witonia, within Łęczyca County, Łódź Voivodeship, in central Poland.
