= Leźnica Mała =

- Village
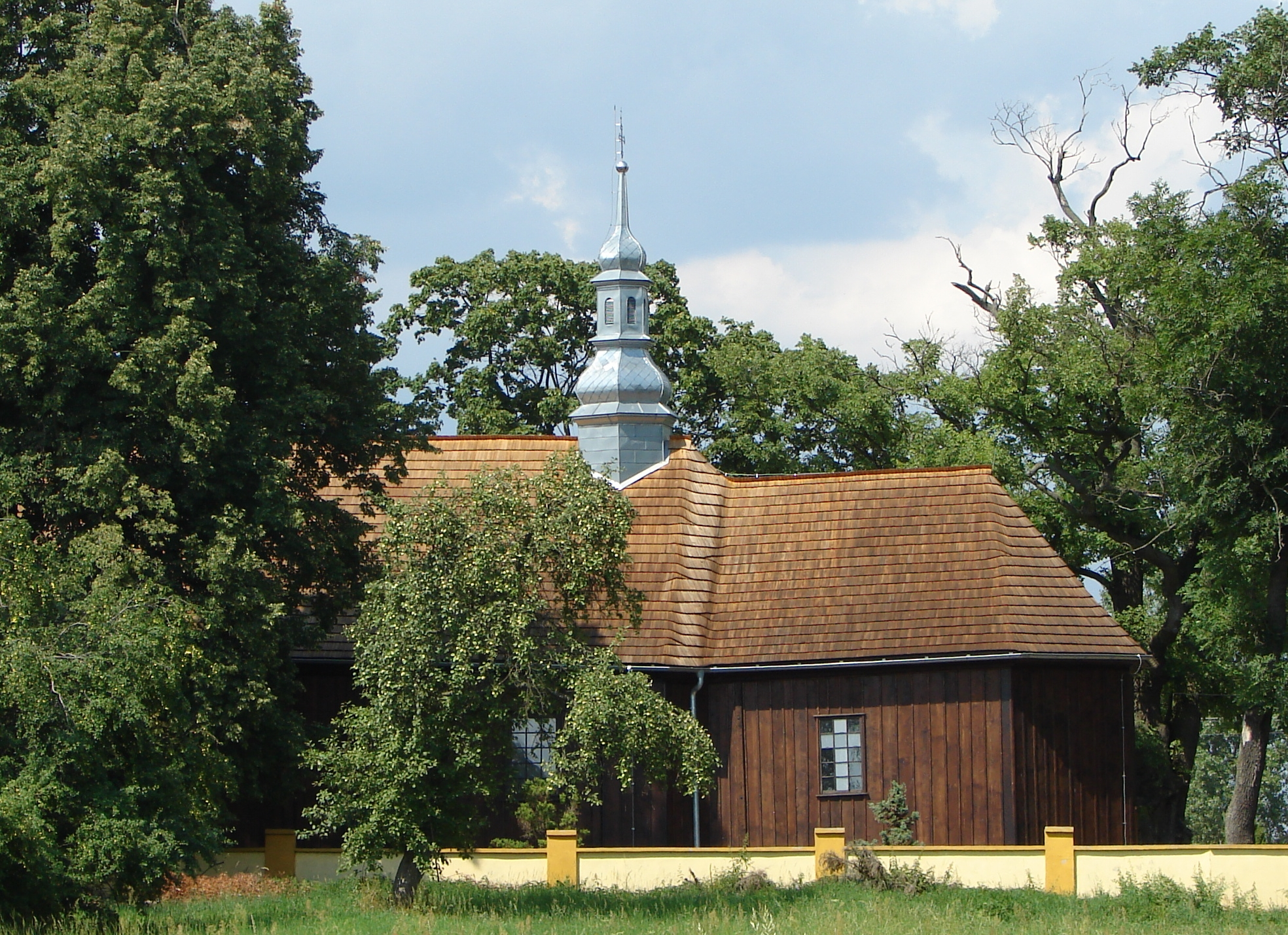
- Wooden parish church of Saint Mary Magdalene, built 1784.

- Location within Poland
- Coordinates: 52°2′N 19°5′E
- Country: Poland
- Voivodeship: Łódź
- County: Łęczyca
- Gmina: Łęczyca
- Elevation: 90 m (300 ft)
- Population (approx.): 500

Leźnica Mała [lɛʑˈnit͡sa ˈmawa] is a village in the administrative district of Gmina Łęczyca, within Łęczyca County, Łódź Voivodeship, in central Poland.

The village has an approximate population of 500.
