= Siedlec-Kolonia =

- Village
- Location within Poland
- Coordinates: 52°06′38″N 19°08′45″E
- Country: Poland
- Voivodeship: Łódź
- County: Łęczyca
- Gmina: Łęczyca

Siedlec-Kolonia [ˈɕɛdlɛt͡s kɔˈlɔɲa] is a village in the administrative district of Gmina Łęczyca, within Łęczyca County, Łódź Voivodeship, in central Poland.
