= Szarowizna =

- Village
- Location within Poland
- Coordinates: 52°6′21″N 19°8′4″E
- Country: Poland
- Voivodeship: Łódź
- County: Łęczyca
- Gmina: Łęczyca

Szarowizna [ʂarɔˈvizna] is a village in the administrative district of Gmina Łęczyca, within Łęczyca County, Łódź Voivodeship, in central Poland.
