= Marynki, Łódź Voivodeship =

Marynki
- Village
- Location within Poland
- Coordinates: 52°4′N 19°17′E
- Country: Poland
- Voivodeship: Łódź
- County: Łęczyca
- Gmina: Góra Świętej Małgorzaty

Marynki [maˈrɨŋki] is a village in the administrative district of Gmina Góra Świętej Małgorzaty, within Łęczyca County, Łódź Voivodeship, in central Poland.
