= Wilczkowice nad Szosą =

- Village
- Location within Poland
- Coordinates: 52°2′38″N 19°7′44″E
- Country: Poland
- Voivodeship: Łódź
- County: Łęczyca
- Gmina: Łęczyca
- Population: 130

Wilczkowice nad Szosą [vilt͡ʂkɔˈvit͡sɛ ˌnat ˈʂɔsɔ̃] is a village in the administrative district of Gmina Łęczyca, within Łęczyca County, Łódź Voivodeship, in central Poland.
