= Mniszki =

Mniszki may refer to the following places:

- Mniszki, Greater Poland Voivodeship (west-central Poland)
- Mniszki, Łódź Voivodeship (central Poland)
- Mniszki, Warmian-Masurian Voivodeship (north Poland)
