= Stary Gaj, Łódź Voivodeship =

Stary Gaj
- Village
- Location within Poland
- Coordinates: 52°4′8″N 19°22′47″E
- Country: Poland
- Voivodeship: Łódź
- County: Łęczyca
- Gmina: Góra Świętej Małgorzaty

Stary Gaj (Polish pronunciation: [ˈstarɨ ˈɡaj]) is a village in the administrative district of Gmina Góra Świętej Małgorzaty, within Łęczyca County, Łódź Voivodeship, in central Poland.
