= Rybitwy =

Rybitwy may refer to the following places:

- Rybitwy, part of the Podgórze district of Kraków
- Rybitwy, Greater Poland Voivodeship (west-central Poland)
- Rybitwy, Kuyavian-Pomeranian Voivodeship (north-central Poland)
- Rybitwy, Łódź Voivodeship (central Poland)
- Rybitwy, Lublin Voivodeship (east Poland)
- Rybitwy, Masovian Voivodeship (east-central Poland)
- Rybitwy, Świętokrzyskie Voivodeship (south-central Poland)
- Rybitwy, Warmian-Masurian Voivodeship (north Poland)
