= Dobrogosty, Łódź Voivodeship =

Dobrogosty
- Village
- Location within Poland
- Coordinates: 52°5′22″N 19°15′9″E
- Country: Poland
- Voivodeship: Łódź
- County: Łęczyca
- Gmina: Łęczyca

Dobrogosty [dɔbrɔˈɡɔstɨ] is a village in the administrative district of Gmina Łęczyca, within Łęczyca County, Łódź Voivodeship, in central Poland.
