= Gaj, Łęczyca County =

Gaj
- Village
- Location within Poland
- Coordinates: 52°3′56″N 19°24′12″E
- Country: Poland
- Voivodeship: Łódź
- County: Łęczyca
- Gmina: Góra Świętej Małgorzaty

Gaj [ɡai̯] is a village in the administrative district of Gmina Góra Świętej Małgorzaty, within Łęczyca County, Łódź Voivodeship, in central Poland.
