= Siemszyce =

- Village
- Location within Poland
- Coordinates: 52°5′N 19°6′E
- Country: Poland
- Voivodeship: Łódź
- County: Łęczyca
- Gmina: Łęczyca

Siemszyce [ɕɛmˈʂɨt͡sɛ] is a village in the administrative district of Gmina Łęczyca, within Łęczyca County, Łódź Voivodeship, in central Poland.
