= Janów, Gmina Góra Świętej Małgorzaty =

Janów
- Settlement
- Location within Poland
- Coordinates: 52°5′11″N 19°22′49″E
- Country: Poland
- Voivodeship: Łódź
- County: Łęczyca
- Gmina: Góra Świętej Małgorzaty

Janów [ˈjanuf] is a settlement in the administrative district of Gmina Góra Świętej Małgorzaty, within Łęczyca County, Łódź Voivodeship, in central Poland.
