= Kuchary, Łęczyca County =

Kuchary
- Village
- Location within Poland
- Coordinates: 52°7′1″N 19°17′15″E
- Country: Poland
- Voivodeship: Łódź
- County: Łęczyca
- Gmina: Witonia

Kuchary [kuˈxarɨ] is a village in the administrative district of Gmina Witonia, within Łęczyca County, Łódź Voivodeship, in central Poland.
