= Pruszki, Łódź Voivodeship =

Village in Gmina Łęczyca, Poland

Pruszki
- Village
- Location within Poland
- Coordinates: 52°06′17″N 19°07′35″E
- Country: Poland
- Voivodeship: Łódź
- County: Łęczyca
- Gmina: Łęczyca

Pruszki [ˈpruʂki] is a village in the administrative district of Gmina Łęczyca, within Łęczyca County, Łódź Voivodeship, in central Poland.
