= Kosiorów =

Kosiorów may refer to the following places in Poland:

- Kosiorów, Łódź Voivodeship (central Poland)
- Kosiorów, Gmina Wilków in Lublin Voivodeship (east Poland)
- Kosiorów, Gmina Łaziska in Lublin Voivodeship (east Poland)
