= Pilichy =

- Village
- Location within Poland
- Coordinates: 52°6′50″N 19°6′29″E
- Country: Poland
- Voivodeship: Łódź
- County: Łęczyca
- Gmina: Łęczyca

Pilichy [piˈlixɨ] is a village in the administrative district of Gmina Łęczyca, within Łęczyca County, Łódź Voivodeship, in central Poland.
