= Węglewice, Łęczyca County =

Węglewice
- Village
- Location within Poland
- Coordinates: 52°7′36″N 19°17′56″E
- Country: Poland
- Voivodeship: Łódź
- County: Łęczyca
- Gmina: Witonia

Węglewice [vɛŋɡlɛˈvit͡sɛ] is a village in the administrative district of Gmina Witonia, within Łęczyca County, Łódź Voivodeship, in central Poland.
