= Łętków =

Village in Gmina Góra Świętej Małgorzaty, Poland

- Village
- Location within Poland
- Coordinates: 52°05′49″N 19°21′54″E
- Country: Poland
- Voivodeship: Łódź
- County: Łęczyca
- Gmina: Góra Świętej Małgorzaty

Łętków [ˈwɛntkuf] is a village in the administrative district of Gmina Góra Świętej Małgorzaty, within Łęczyca County, Łódź Voivodeship, in central Poland.
