= Romartów =

- Village
- Location within Poland
- Coordinates: 52°8′N 19°16′E
- Country: Poland
- Voivodeship: Łódź
- County: Łęczyca
- Gmina: Witonia

Romartów [rɔˈmartuf] is a village in the administrative district of Gmina Witonia, within Łęczyca County, Łódź Voivodeship, in central Poland.
