= Garbalin =

- Village
- Location within Poland
- Coordinates: 52°6′N 19°10′E
- Country: Poland
- Voivodeship: Łódź
- County: Łęczyca
- Gmina: Łęczyca

Garbalin [ɡarˈbalin] is a village in the administrative district of Gmina Łęczyca, within Łęczyca County, Łódź Voivodeship, in central Poland.
