= Lubień, Łęczyca County =

Lubień
- Village
- Location within Poland
- Coordinates: 52°1′31″N 19°13′30″E
- Country: Poland
- Voivodeship: Łódź
- County: Łęczyca
- Gmina: Łęczyca

Lubień (Polish pronunciation: [ˈlubjɛj̃]) is a village in the administrative district of Gmina Łęczyca, within Łęczyca County, Łódź Voivodeship, in central Poland.
