= Helenendorf =

Helenendorf may refer to the following places in Azerbaijan:

- Goygol (city), named Helenendorf until 1931
- Bibiheybət, a municipality in Baku, formerly known as Helenendorf
