= Józinki, Łódź Voivodeship =

Józinki
- Village
- Location within Poland
- Coordinates: 52°10′1″N 19°19′2″E
- Country: Poland
- Voivodeship: Łódź
- County: Łęczyca
- Gmina: Witonia
- Population: 250

Józinki [juˈʑinki] is a village in the administrative district of Gmina Witonia, within Łęczyca County, Łódź Voivodeship, in central Poland.
