= Siedlec =

Siedlec may refer to the following places in Poland:

- Siedlec, Lower Silesian Voivodeship (south-west Poland)
- Siedlec, Łęczyca County in Łódź Voivodeship (central Poland)
- Siedlec, Pajęczno County in Łódź Voivodeship (central Poland)
- Siedlec, Bochnia County in Lesser Poland Voivodeship (south Poland)
- Siedlec, Kraków County in Lesser Poland Voivodeship (south Poland)
- Siedlec, Tarnów County in Lesser Poland Voivodeship (south Poland)
- Siedlec, Gostyń County in Greater Poland Voivodeship (west-central Poland)
- Siedlec, Poznań County in Greater Poland Voivodeship (west-central Poland)
- Siedlec, Wolsztyn County in Greater Poland Voivodeship (west-central Poland)
- Siedlec, Gmina Janów in Silesian Voivodeship (south Poland)
- Siedlec, Gmina Mstów in Silesian Voivodeship (south Poland)
- Siedlec, Lubusz Voivodeship (west Poland)
- Siedlec, Nysa County in Opole Voivodeship (south-west Poland)
- Siedlec, Strzelce County in Opole Voivodeship (south-west Poland)
