= Błonie, Łęczyca County =

Błonie
- Village
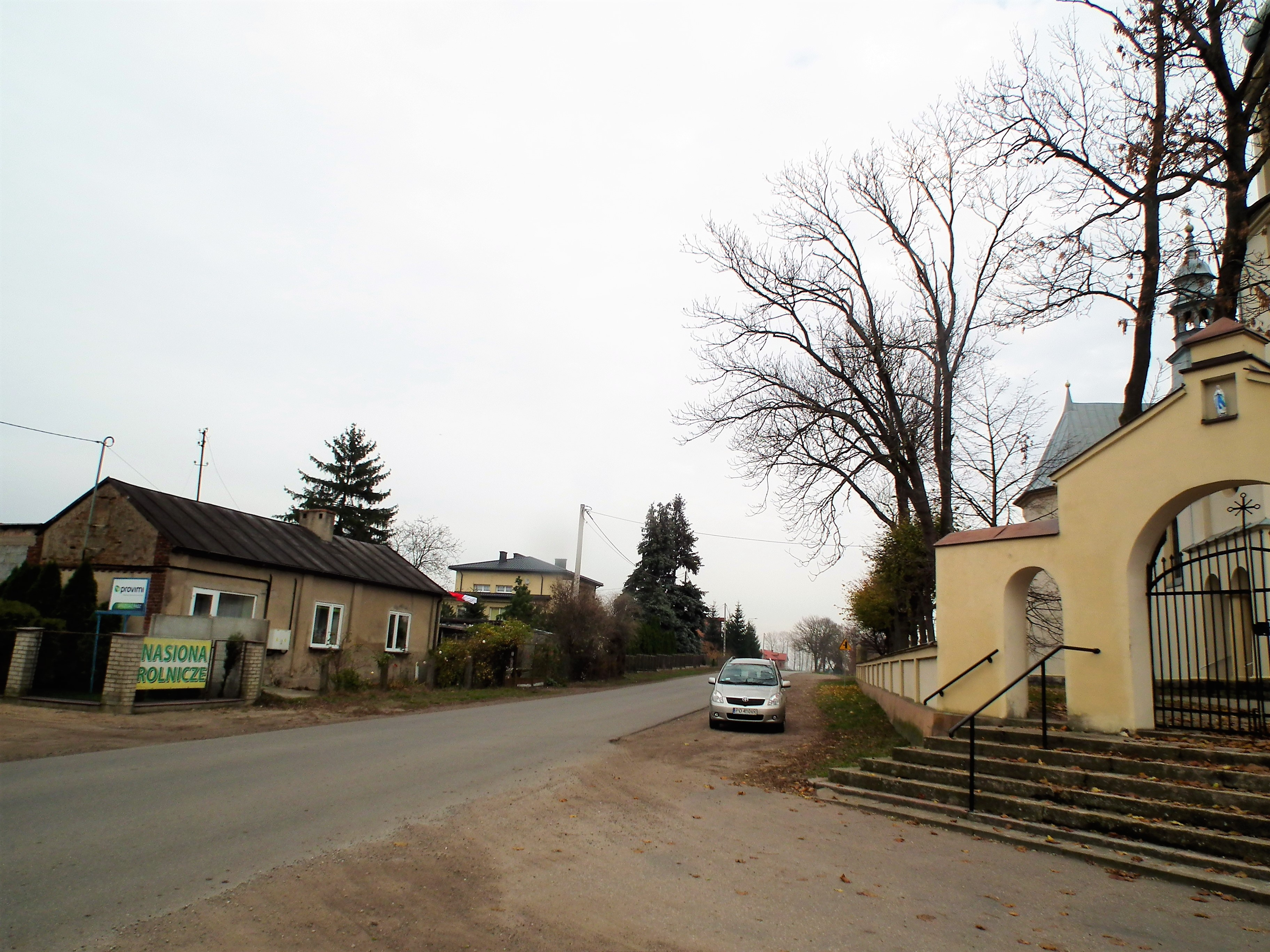

- Location within Poland
- Coordinates: 52°4′35″N 19°8′15″E
- Country: Poland
- Voivodeship: Łódź
- County: Łęczyca
- Gmina: Łęczyca
- Population: 550

Błonie [ˈbwɔɲɛ] is a village in the administrative district of Gmina Łęczyca, within Łęczyca County, Łódź Voivodeship, in central Poland.
