= Zduny, Łęczyca County =

Zduny
- Village
- Location within Poland
- Coordinates: 52°1′50″N 19°7′6″E
- Country: Poland
- Voivodeship: Łódź
- County: Łęczyca
- Gmina: Łęczyca

Zduny [ˈzdunɨ] is a village in the administrative district of Gmina Łęczyca, within Łęczyca County, Łódź Voivodeship, in central Poland.
