= Oraczew =

Oraczew kolonia
- Village
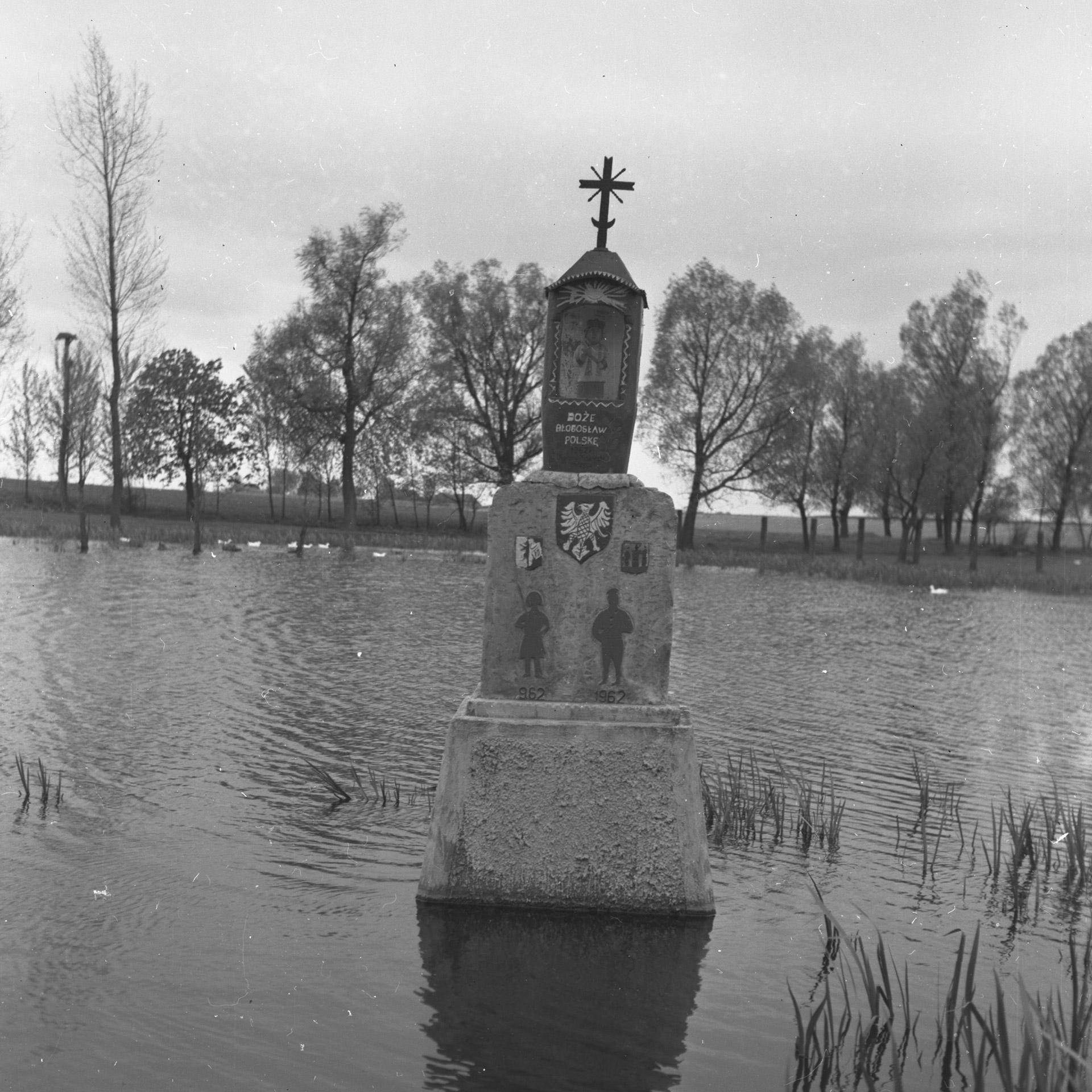

- Location within Poland
- Coordinates: 52°7′58″N 19°14′14″E
- Country: Poland
- Voivodeship: Łódź
- County: Łęczyca
- Gmina: Witonia

Oraczew kolonia [ɔˈrat͡ʂɛf] is a village in the administrative district of Gmina Witonia, within Łęczyca County, Łódź Voivodeship, in central Poland.
