= Anusin =

Anusin may refer to the following places:

- Anusin, Kuyavian-Pomeranian Voivodeship (north-central Poland)
- Anusin, Lublin Voivodeship (east Poland)
- Anusin, Gmina Nurzec-Stacja in Podlaskie Voivodeship (north-east Poland)
- Anusin, Gmina Siemiatycze in Podlaskie Voivodeship (north-east Poland)
- Anusin, Łęczyca County in Łódź Voivodeship (central Poland)
- Anusin, Poddębice County in Łódź Voivodeship (central Poland)
- Anusin, Masovian Voivodeship (east-central Poland)
- Anusin, Greater Poland Voivodeship (west-central Poland)
