= Prusinowice =

Prusinowice may refer to the following places:

- Prusinowice, Łęczyca County in Łódź Voivodeship (central Poland)
- Prusinowice, Pabianice County in Łódź Voivodeship (central Poland)
- Prusinowice, Zduńska Wola County in Łódź Voivodeship (central Poland)
- Prusinowice, Świętokrzyskie Voivodeship (south-central Poland)
- Prusinowice, Masovian Voivodeship (east-central Poland)
- Prusinowice, Opole Voivodeship (south-west Poland)
