= Dąbie, Łęczyca County =

Dąbie
- Village
- Location within Poland
- Coordinates: 52°5′56″N 19°9′42″E
- Country: Poland
- Voivodeship: Łódź
- County: Łęczyca
- Gmina: Łęczyca

Dąbie [ˈdɔmbjɛ] is a village in the administrative district of Gmina Łęczyca, within Łęczyca County, Łódź Voivodeship, in central Poland.
