= Węglewice-Kolonia =

- Village
- Location within Poland
- Coordinates: 52°6′32″N 19°18′12″E
- Country: Poland
- Voivodeship: Łódź
- County: Łęczyca
- Gmina: Witonia

Węglewice-Kolonia [vɛŋɡlɛˈvit͡sɛ kɔˈlɔɲa] is a village in the administrative district of Gmina Witonia, within Łęczyca County, Łódź Voivodeship, in central Poland.
