= Zawada, Łęczyca County =

Zawada
- Village
- Location within Poland
- Coordinates: 52°4′41″N 19°5′58″E
- Country: Poland
- Voivodeship: Łódź
- County: Łęczyca
- Gmina: Łęczyca

Zawada [zaˈvada] is a village in the administrative district of Gmina Łęczyca, within Łęczyca County, Łódź Voivodeship, in central Poland.
