= Konstancin =

- Village
- Location within Poland
- Coordinates: 52°5′34″N 19°20′56″E
- Country: Poland
- Voivodeship: Łódź
- County: Łęczyca
- Gmina: Góra Świętej Małgorzaty

Konstancin [kɔnsˈtant͡ɕin] is a village in the administrative district of Gmina Góra Świętej Małgorzaty, within Łęczyca County, Łódź Voivodeship, in central Poland.
