= Prądzew, Łęczyca County =

Prądzew
- Village
- Location within Poland
- Coordinates: 52°06′22″N 19°15′18″E
- Country: Poland
- Voivodeship: Łódź
- County: Łęczyca
- Gmina: Łęczyca

Prądzew [ˈprɔnd͡zɛf] is a village in the administrative district of Gmina Łęczyca, within Łęczyca County, Łódź Voivodeship, in central Poland.
