= Bryski =

Bryski may refer to:

- Bryski, Łódź Voivodeship, a village in the administrative district of Gmina Góra Świętej Małgorzaty, Poland
- Bryski, Masovian Voivodeship, a village in the administrative district of Gmina Rościszewo, Poland
