= Kwiatkowek =

Kwiatkówek may refer to the following places in Poland:

- Kwiatkówek, Łódź Voivodeship (central Poland)
- Kwiatkówek, Masovian Voivodeship (east-central Poland)
