= Podgórzyce =

Podgórzyce may refer to the following places:

- Podgórzyce, Łódź Voivodeship (central Poland)
- Podgórzyce, Lubusz Voivodeship (west Poland)
- Podgórzyce, Masovian Voivodeship (east-central Poland)
