= Gajew, Łęczyca County =

Gajew
- Village
- Location within Poland
- Coordinates: 52°8′55″N 19°14′4″E
- Country: Poland
- Voivodeship: Łódź
- County: Łęczyca
- Gmina: Witonia

Gajew [ˈɡajɛf] is a village in the administrative district of Gmina Witonia, within Łęczyca County, Łódź Voivodeship, in central Poland.
