= Rudniki, Łęczyca County =

Rudniki
- Village
- Location within Poland
- Coordinates: 52°10′37″N 19°13′44″E
- Country: Poland
- Voivodeship: Łódź
- County: Łęczyca
- Gmina: Witonia

Rudniki [rudˈniki] is a village in the administrative district of Gmina Witonia, within Łęczyca County, Łódź Voivodeship, in central Poland.
