= Borek, Łęczyca County =

Borek
- Village
- Location within Poland
- Coordinates: 52°2′3″N 19°3′15″E
- Country: Poland
- Voivodeship: Łódź
- County: Łęczyca
- Gmina: Łęczyca

Borek [ˈbɔrɛk] is a village in the administrative district of Gmina Łęczyca, within Łęczyca County, Łódź Voivodeship, in central Poland.
