= Nędzerzew, Łódź Voivodeship =

Nędzerzew
- Village
- Location within Poland
- Coordinates: 52°7′28″N 19°19′10″E
- Country: Poland
- Voivodeship: Łódź
- County: Łęczyca
- Gmina: Witonia

Nędzerzew [nɛnˈd͡zɛʐɛf] is a village in the administrative district of Gmina Witonia, within Łęczyca County, Łódź Voivodeship, in central Poland.
