= Stawy =

Stawy may refer to the following places:

- Stawy, Greater Poland Voivodeship (west-central Poland)
- Stawy, Łódź Voivodeship (central Poland)
- Stawy, Świętokrzyskie Voivodeship (south-central Poland)
- Stawy, Lubusz Voivodeship (west Poland)
- Stawy, Opole Voivodeship (south-west Poland)
