= Kozuby, Łódź Voivodeship =

Kozuby
- Village
- Location within Poland
- Coordinates: 52°5′5″N 19°13′52″E
- Country: Poland
- Voivodeship: Łódź
- County: Łęczyca
- Gmina: Łęczyca

Kozuby [kɔˈzubɨ] is a village in the administrative district of Gmina Łęczyca, within Łęczyca County, Łódź Voivodeship, in central Poland.
