= Bronno =

- Village
- Location within Poland
- Coordinates: 52°3′N 19°5′E
- Country: Poland
- Voivodeship: Łódź
- County: Łęczyca
- Gmina: Łęczyca

Bronno [ˈbrɔnnɔ] is a village in the administrative district of Gmina Łęczyca, within Łęczyca County, Łódź Voivodeship, in central Poland.

Bronno is home to production plants of Ekopol—a manufacturer of domestic sewage treatment plants—and a facility that produces paving bricks.

The village features a water intake that supplies the southern part of the Łęczyca municipality. Bronno's drinking water intake system includes two deep wells with a combined capacity of 170 m³/h.

In the village of Bronno, there is a water treatment station.

- The average daily output of the station is 558.2 m³ per day;
- The length of the serviced distribution water network is about 90.0 km (56 mi).

Between 1975 and 1998, the village was administratively part of Płock Voivodeship.
