= Łęka, Gmina Łęczyca =

Łęka
- Village
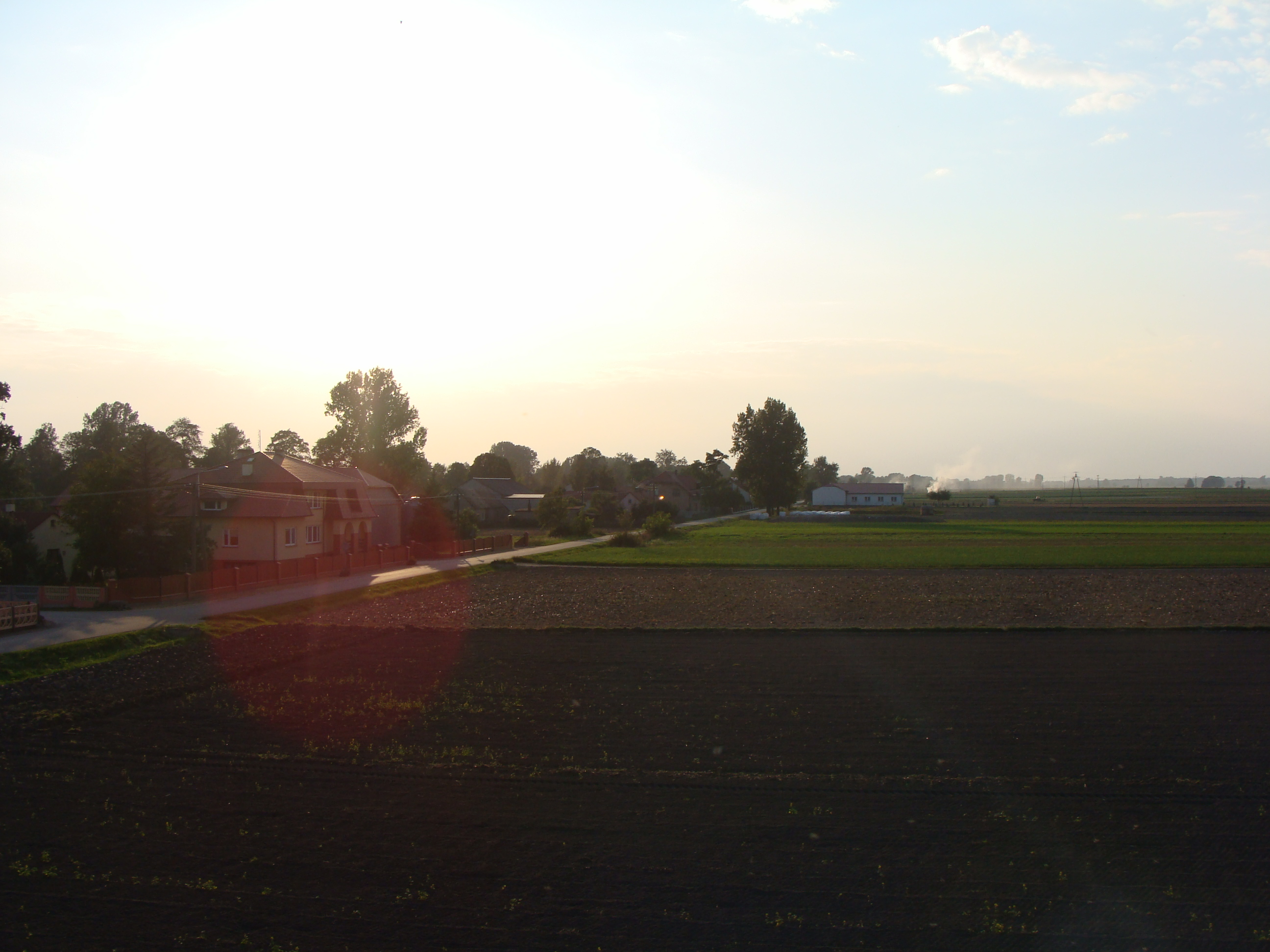

- Location within Poland
- Coordinates: 52°4′42″N 19°3′25″E
- Country: Poland
- Voivodeship: Łódź
- County: Łęczyca
- Gmina: Łęczyca

Łęka [ˈwɛnka] is a village in the administrative district of Gmina Łęczyca, within Łęczyca County, Łódź Voivodeship, in central Poland.
