= Krzepocin Drugi =

- Village
- Location within Poland
- Coordinates: 52°5′5″N 19°6′5″E
- Country: Poland
- Voivodeship: Łódź
- County: Łęczyca
- Gmina: Łęczyca

Krzepocin Drugi [kʂɛˈpɔt͡ɕin ˈdruɡi] is a village in the administrative district of Gmina Łęczyca, within Łęczyca County, Łódź Voivodeship, in central Poland.
