= Borów, Gmina Łęczyca =

Borów
- Village
- Location within Poland
- Coordinates: 52°2′57″N 19°4′1″E
- Country: Poland
- Voivodeship: Łódź
- County: Łęczyca
- Gmina: Łęczyca

Borów [ˈbɔruf] is a village in the administrative district of Gmina Łęczyca, within Łęczyca County, Łódź Voivodeship, in central Poland.
