= Maciejów, Łęczyca County =

Maciejów
- Village
- Location within Poland
- Coordinates: 52°4′29″N 19°22′36″E
- Country: Poland
- Voivodeship: Łódź
- County: Łęczyca
- Gmina: Góra Świętej Małgorzaty

Maciejów [maˈt͡ɕɛjuf] is a village in the administrative district of Gmina Góra Świętej Małgorzaty, within Łęczyca County, Łódź Voivodeship, in central Poland.
