= Krzepocin Pierwszy =

- Village
- Location within Poland
- Coordinates: 52°1′N 19°9′E
- Country: Poland
- Voivodeship: Łódź
- County: Łęczyca
- Gmina: Łęczyca

Krzepocin Pierwszy [kʂɛˈpɔt͡ɕin ˈpjɛrfʂɨ] is a village in the administrative district of Gmina Łęczyca, within Łęczyca County, Łódź Voivodeship, in central Poland.
