= Karsznice =

Karsznice may refer to the following places:

- Karsznice, Łęczyca County in Łódź Voivodeship (central Poland)
- Karsznice, Zduńska Wola County in Łódź Voivodeship (central Poland)
- Karsznice, Świętokrzyskie Voivodeship (south-central Poland)
