= Pavel Pototsky =

Pavel Pototsky may refer to:

- Pavel Pototsky (general)
- Pavel Pototsky (engineer)
