= Wichrów =

Wichrów may refer to the following places in Poland:

- Wichrów, Lower Silesian Voivodeship (south-west Poland)
- Wichrów, Łódź Voivodeship (central Poland)
- Wichrów, Opole Voivodeship (south-west Poland)
