= Kostusin, Łódź Voivodeship =

Kostusin
- Village
- Location within Poland
- Coordinates: 52°10′11″N 19°17′24″E
- Country: Poland
- Voivodeship: Łódź
- County: Łęczyca
- Gmina: Witonia

Kostusin [kɔsˈtuɕin] is a village in the administrative district of Gmina Witonia, within Łęczyca County, Łódź Voivodeship, in central Poland.
