= Borki, Łęczyca County =

Borki
- Village
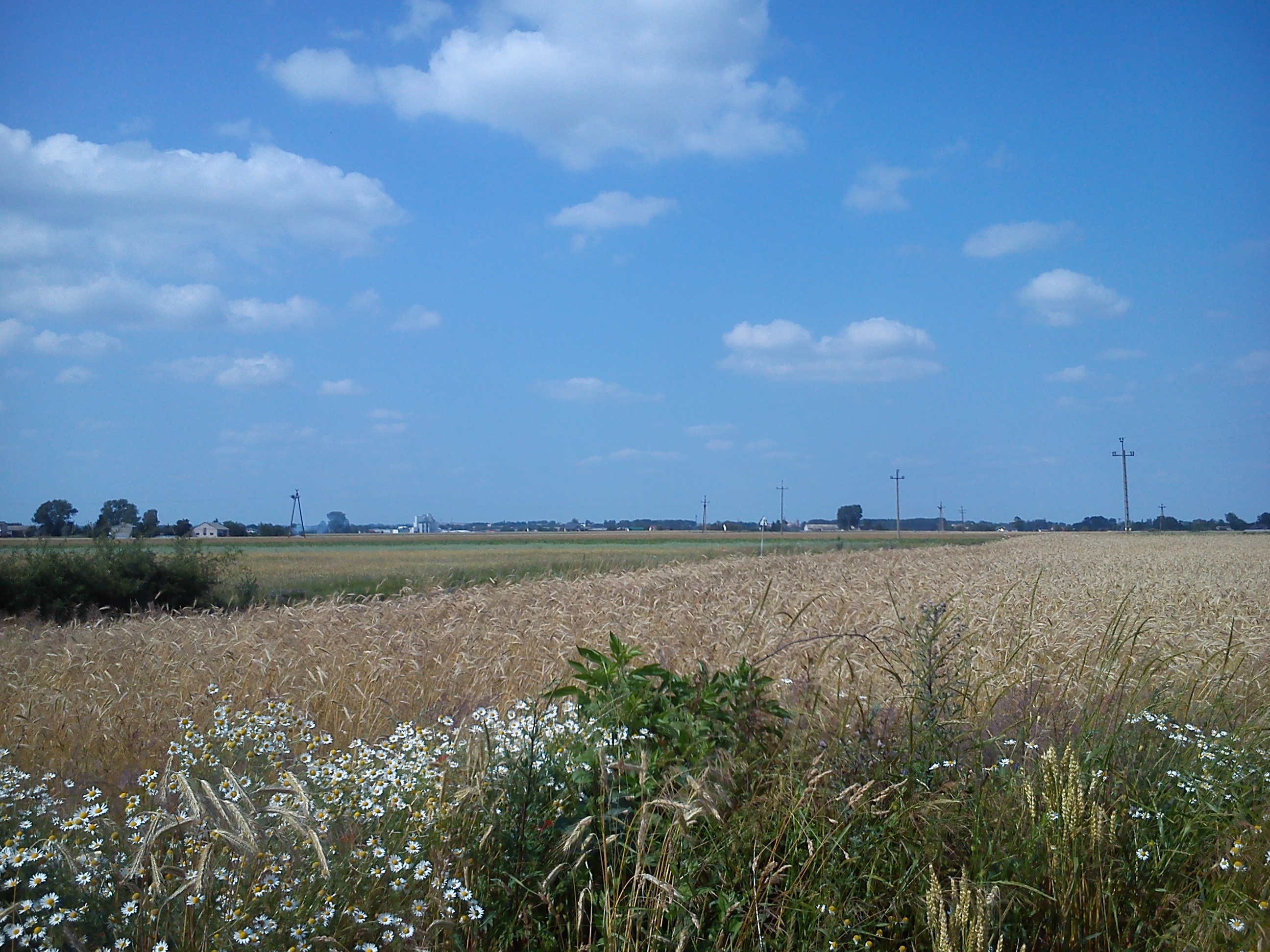

- Location within Poland
- Coordinates: 52°2′12″N 19°12′7″E
- Country: Poland
- Voivodeship: Łódź
- County: Łęczyca
- Gmina: Łęczyca

Borki [ˈbɔrki] is a village in the administrative district of Gmina Łęczyca, within Łęczyca County, Łódź Voivodeship, in central Poland.
