= Orszewice =

- Village
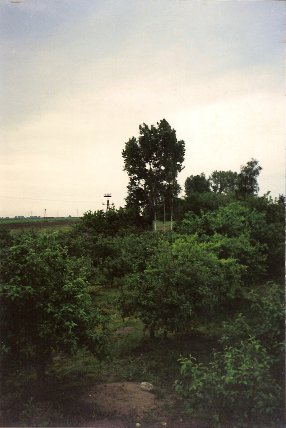

- Location within Poland
- Coordinates: 52°5′N 19°19′E
- Country: Poland
- Voivodeship: Łódź
- County: Łęczyca
- Gmina: Góra Świętej Małgorzaty
- Population (approx.): 240

Orszewice [ɔrʂɛˈvit͡sɛ] is a village in the administrative district of Gmina Góra Świętej Małgorzaty, within Łęczyca County, Łódź Voivodeship, in central Poland.

The village has an approximate population of 240.
