= Karkosy =

- Village
- Location within Poland
- Coordinates: 52°0′48″N 19°4′58″E
- Country: Poland
- Voivodeship: Łódź
- County: Łęczyca
- Gmina: Łęczyca

Karkosy [karˈkɔsɨ] is a village in the administrative district of Gmina Łęczyca, within Łęczyca County, Łódź Voivodeship, in central Poland.
