= Piekacie =

- Village
- Location within Poland
- Coordinates: 52°05′50″N 19°06′28″E
- Country: Poland
- Voivodeship: Łódź
- County: Łęczyca
- Gmina: Łęczyca

Piekacie [pjɛˈkat͡ɕɛ] is a village in the administrative district of Gmina Łęczyca, within Łęczyca County, Łódź Voivodeship, in central Poland.
