= Kosin (name) =

Kosin or Kosins is both a given name and surname. Notable people with the name include:

- Kosin Hembut (born 1982), Thai footballer
- Phil Kosin (1950–2009), American journalist
- Yuri Kosin (1948–2022), Ukrainian photographer
- Gary Kosins (born 1949), American football player
- Kathy Kosins (born 1954), American singer
