= Gołocice =

- Village
- Location within Poland
- Coordinates: 52°7′41″N 19°13′24″E
- Country: Poland
- Voivodeship: Łódź
- County: Łęczyca
- Gmina: Witonia

Gołocice [ɡɔwɔˈt͡ɕit͡sɛ] is a village in the administrative district of Gmina Witonia, within Łęczyca County, Łódź Voivodeship, in central Poland.
