= Janków =

Janków may refer to the following places in Poland:

- Janków, Lower Silesian Voivodeship (south-west Poland)
- Janków, Gmina Łęczyca in Łódź Voivodeship (central Poland)
- Janków, Gmina Piątek in Łódź Voivodeship (central Poland)
- Janków, Gmina Rokiciny, Tomaszów County in Łódź Voivodeship (central Poland)
- Janków, Kalisz County in Greater Poland Voivodeship (west-central Poland)
- Janków, Pleszew County in Greater Poland Voivodeship (west-central Poland)
- Janków, West Pomeranian Voivodeship (north-west Poland)
