= Liszki =

Liszki may refer to the following places:

- Liszki, Lesser Poland Voivodeship (south Poland)
- Liszki, Łódź Voivodeship (central Poland)
- Liszki, Masovian Voivodeship (east-central Poland)
- Liszki, Warmian-Masurian Voivodeship (north Poland)
