= Nova Topola =

Nova Topola may refer to:

- Nova Topola, Lebane, in Serbia
- Nova Topola, Gradiška, in Bosnia and Herzegovina

== See also ==
- Topola (disambiguation)
