= Wilczkowice Górne, Łódź Voivodeship =

Wilczkowice Górne
- Village
- Location within Poland
- Coordinates: 52°2′38″N 19°7′44″E
- Country: Poland
- Voivodeship: Łódź
- County: Łęczyca
- Gmina: Łęczyca
- Population: 150

Wilczkowice Górne [vilt͡ʂkɔˈvit͡sɛ ˈɡurnɛ] is a village in the administrative district of Gmina Łęczyca, within Łęczyca County, Łódź Voivodeship, in central Poland.
