= Mikołajew =

Mikołajew may refer to the following places:

- Mikołajew, Łęczyca County in Łódź Voivodeship (central Poland)
- Mikołajew, Zgierz County in Łódź Voivodeship (central Poland)
- Mikołajew, Podlaskie Voivodeship (north-east Poland)
- Mikołajew, Masovian Voivodeship (east-central Poland)
