= Zagaj =

Zagaj may refer to the following places:

- Zagaj, Greater Poland Voivodeship (west-central Poland)
- Zagaj, Łódź Voivodeship (central Poland)
- Zagaj, West Pomeranian Voivodeship (north-west Poland)
