= Gmina Góra Świętej Małgorzaty =

Gmina Góra Świętej Małgorzaty Góra Świętej Małgorzaty Commune
- Gmina

- Flag Coat of arms
- Interactive map of Gmina Góra Świętej Małgorzaty
- Coordinates (Góra Świętej Małgorzaty): 52°3′N 19°19′E
- Country: Poland
- Voivodeship: Łódź
- County: Łęczyca
- Seat: Góra Świętej Małgorzaty

Area
  - Total: 90.42 km^{2} (34.91 sq mi)

Population (2006)
  - Total: 4,578
  - Density: 50.63/km^{2} (131.1/sq mi)
- Time zone: UTC+1 (CET)
  - Summer (DST): UTC+2 (CEST)
- Website: www.goraswmalgorzaty.pl/start.html

Gmina Góra Świętej Małgorzaty is a rural gmina (administrative district) in Łęczyca County, Łódź Voivodeship, in central Poland. Its seat is the village of Góra Świętej Małgorzaty, which lies approximately 8 kilometres (5 mi) east of Łęczyca and 32 km (20 mi) north of the regional capital Łódź.

The gmina covers an area of 90.42 square kilometres (34.9 sq mi), and as of 2006 its total population is 4,578.

== Villages ==
Gmina Góra Świętej Małgorzaty contains the villages and settlements of:

- Ambrożew
- Bogdańczew
- Bryski
- Bryski-Kolonia
- Czarnopole
- Gaj
- Głupiejew
- Góra Świętej Małgorzaty
- Janów
- Karsznice
- Konstancin
- Kosin
- Kosiorów
- Kwiatkówek
- Łętków
- Maciejów
- Marynki
- Mętlew
- Mierczyn
- Moraków
- Nowy Gaj
- Orszewice
- Podgórzyce
- Rogulice
- Sługi
- Stary Gaj
- Stawy
- Tum
- Witaszewice
- Zagaj

== Neighbouring gminas ==
Gmina Góra Świętej Małgorzaty is bordered by the towns of Łęczyca and Ozorków, and by the gminas of Krzyżanów, Łęczyca, Ozorków, Piątek and Witonia.
