= Siedlec, Łęczyca County =

Siedlec
- Village
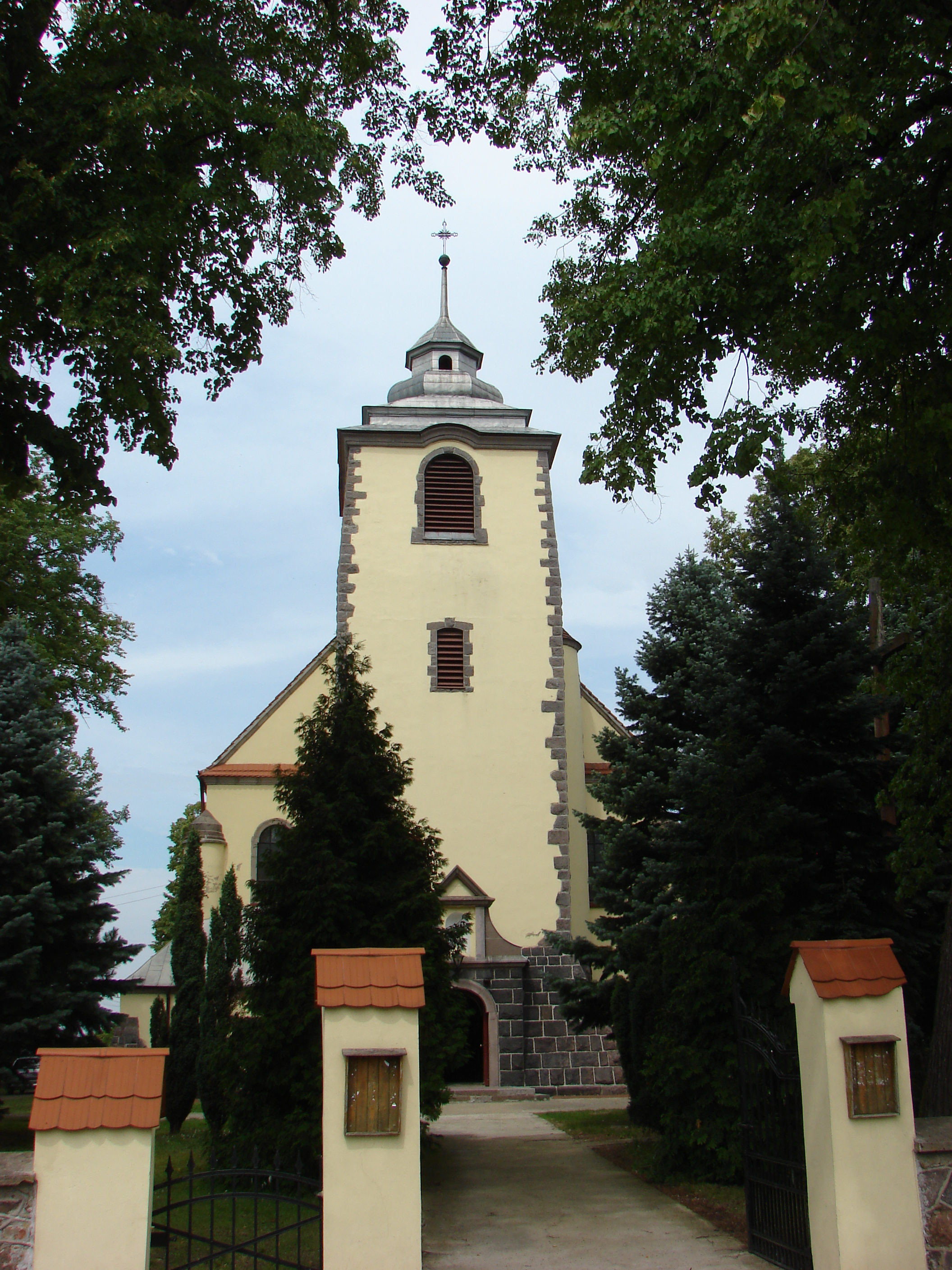
- Parish church

- Location within Poland
- Coordinates: 52°6′56″N 19°8′22″E
- Country: Poland
- Voivodeship: Łódź
- County: Łęczyca
- Gmina: Łęczyca
- Population: 450

Siedlec [ˈɕɛdlɛt͡s] is a village in the administrative district of Gmina Łęczyca, within Łęczyca County, Łódź Voivodeship, in central Poland.
