= Góra Świętej Małgorzaty =

- Village
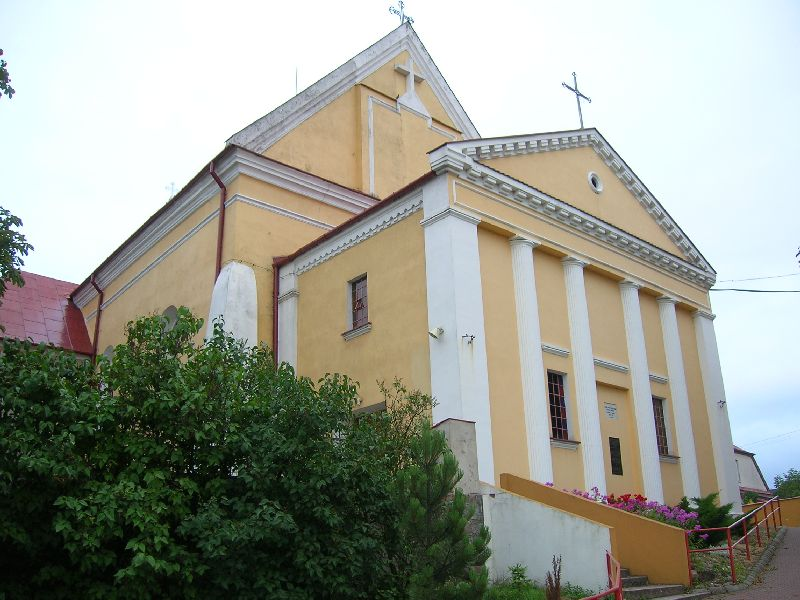
- Saint Margaret Church

- Coat of arms

- Location within Poland
- Coordinates: 52°3′N 19°19′E
- Country: Poland
- Voivodeship: Łódź
- County: Łęczyca
- Gmina: Góra Świętej Małgorzaty
- Elevation: 136 m (446 ft)
- Population (2011): 311

Góra Świętej Małgorzaty (Polish: [ˈɡura ˈɕfjɛntɛj mawɡɔˈʐatɨ]; "St. Margaret's Mountain") is a village in Łęczyca County, Łódź Voivodeship, in central Poland. It is the seat of the gmina (administrative district) called Gmina Góra Świętej Małgorzaty.
