= Janków, Gmina Łęczyca =

Janków
- Village
- Location within Poland
- Coordinates: 52°1′36″N 19°4′52″E
- Country: Poland
- Voivodeship: Łódź
- County: Łęczyca
- Gmina: Łęczyca

Janków [ˈjankuf] is a village in the administrative district of Gmina Łęczyca, within Łęczyca County, Łódź Voivodeship, in central Poland.
