= Bryski, Łódź Voivodeship =

Bryski
- Village
- Location within Poland
- Coordinates: 52°3′N 19°22′E
- Country: Poland
- Voivodeship: Łódź
- County: Łęczyca
- Gmina: Góra Świętej Małgorzaty

Bryski [ˈbrɨski] is a village in the administrative district of Gmina Góra Świętej Małgorzaty, within Łęczyca County, Łódź Voivodeship, in central Poland.

== See also ==
- Collegiate Church of St. Mary and St. Alexius, Tum
