= Mniszki, Łódź Voivodeship =

Mniszki
- Village
- Location within Poland
- Coordinates: 52°1′0″N 19°6′44″E
- Country: Poland
- Voivodeship: Łódź
- County: Łęczyca
- Gmina: Łęczyca

Mniszki [ˈmniʂki] is a village in the administrative district of Gmina Łęczyca, within Łęczyca County, Łódź Voivodeship, in central Poland.
