= Stawy, Łódź Voivodeship =

Stawy
- Village
- Location within Poland
- Coordinates: 52°4′N 19°25′E
- Country: Poland
- Voivodeship: Łódź
- County: Łęczyca
- Gmina: Góra Świętej Małgorzaty

Stawy [ˈstavɨ] is a village in the administrative district of Gmina Góra Świętej Małgorzaty, within Łęczyca County, Łódź Voivodeship, in central Poland.
