= Anusin, Łęczyca County =

Anusin
- Village
- Location within Poland
- Coordinates: 52°9′20″N 19°19′18″E
- Country: Poland
- Voivodeship: Łódź
- County: Łęczyca
- Gmina: Witonia

Anusin [aˈnuɕin] is a village in the administrative district of Gmina Witonia, within Łęczyca County, Łódź Voivodeship, in central Poland.
