= Karsznice, Łęczyca County =

Karsznice
- Village
- Location within Poland
- Coordinates: 52°2′N 19°22′E
- Country: Poland
- Voivodeship: Łódź
- County: Łęczyca
- Gmina: Góra Świętej Małgorzaty

Karsznice [karʂˈnit͡sɛ] is a village in the administrative district of Gmina Góra Świętej Małgorzaty, within Łęczyca County, Łódź Voivodeship, in central Poland.
