= Gmina Łęczyca =

Gmina Łęczyca Łęczyca Commune
- Gmina
- Coat of arms
- Interactive map of Gmina Łęczyca
- Coordinates (Łęczyca): 52°3′N 19°12′E
- Country: Poland
- Voivodeship: Łódź
- County: Łęczyca
- Seat: Łęczyca

Area
  - Total: 150.8 km^{2} (58.2 sq mi)

Population (2006)
  - Total: 8,549
  - Density: 56.69/km^{2} (146.8/sq mi)

Gmina Łęczyca is a rural gmina (administrative district) in Łęczyca County, Łódź Voivodeship, in central Poland. Its seat is the town of Łęczyca, although the town is not part of the gmina's territory.

The gmina covers an area of 150.8 square kilometres (58.2 sq mi), and as of 2006 its total population was 8,549.

== Villages ==
Gmina Łęczyca contains the villages and settlements of Błonie, Borek, Borki, Borów, Bronno, Chrząstówek, Dąbie, Dobrogosty, Dzierzbiętów Duży, Dzierzbiętów Mały, Garbalin, Gawrony, Janków, Karkosy, Kozuby, Krzepocin Drugi, Krzepocin Pierwszy, Łęka, Łęka-Kolonia, Leszcze, Leźnica Mała, Liszki, Lubień, Mikołajew, Mniszki, Piekacie, Pilichy, Prądzew, Prusinowice, Pruszki, Siedlec, Siedlec-Kolonia, Siemszyce, Szarowizna, Topola Katowa, Topola Królewska, Topola Szlachecka, Wąkczew, Wichrów, Wilczkowice Dolne, Wilczkowice Górne, Wilczkowice nad Szosą, Wilczkowice Średnie, Zawada, Zawada Górna and Zduny.

== Neighbouring gminas ==
Gmina Łęczyca is bordered by the town of Łęczyca and by the gminas of Daszyna, Góra Świętej Małgorzaty, Grabów, Ozorków, Parzęczew, Świnice Warckie, Wartkowice and Witonia.
