= Kosiorów, Łódź Voivodeship =

Kosiorów
- Settlement
- Location within Poland
- Coordinates: 52°2′43″N 19°17′20″E
- Country: Poland
- Voivodeship: Łódź
- County: Łęczyca
- Gmina: Góra Świętej Małgorzaty

Kosiorów [kɔˈɕɔruf] is a settlement in the administrative district of Gmina Góra Świętej Małgorzaty, within Łęczyca County, Łódź Voivodeship, in central Poland.
