= Rybitwy, Łódź Voivodeship =

Rybitwy
- Village
- Location within Poland
- Coordinates: 52°6′33″N 19°16′56″E
- Country: Poland
- Voivodeship: Łódź
- County: Łęczyca
- Gmina: Witonia

Rybitwy [rɨˈbitfɨ] is a village in the administrative district of Gmina Witonia, within Łęczyca County, Łódź Voivodeship, in central Poland.
