= Liszki, Łódź Voivodeship =

Liszki
- Village
- Location within Poland
- Coordinates: 52°3′38″N 19°3′29″E
- Country: Poland
- Voivodeship: Łódź
- County: Łęczyca
- Gmina: Łęczyca

Liszki [ˈliʂki] is a village in the administrative district of Gmina Łęczyca, within Łęczyca County, Łódź Voivodeship, in central Poland.
