= Stara Wargawa =

- Village
- Location within Poland
- Coordinates: 52°10′51″N 19°14′28″E
- Country: Poland
- Voivodeship: Łódź
- County: Łęczyca
- Gmina: Witonia

Stara Wargawa [ˈstara varˈɡava] is a village in the administrative district of Gmina Witonia, within Łęczyca County, Łódź Voivodeship, in central Poland.
