= Kosin, Łódź Voivodeship =

Kosin
- Village
- Location within Poland
- Coordinates: 52°2′N 19°20′E
- Country: Poland
- Voivodeship: Łódź
- County: Łęczyca
- Gmina: Góra Świętej Małgorzaty

Kosin (pronounced [ˈkɔɕin]) is a village in the administrative district of Gmina Góra Świętej Małgorzaty, within Łęczyca County, Łódź Voivodeship, in central Poland.
