= Wargawka Stara =

- Village
- Location within Poland
- Coordinates: 52°9′28″N 19°15′36″E
- Country: Poland
- Voivodeship: Łódź
- County: Łęczyca
- Gmina: Witonia
- Population: 80

Wargawka Stara [varˈɡafka ˈstara] is a village in the administrative district of Gmina Witonia, within Łęczyca County, Łódź Voivodeship, in central Poland.
