= Zagaj, Łódź Voivodeship =

Zagaj
- Village
- Location within Poland
- Coordinates: 52°6′N 19°19′E
- Country: Poland
- Voivodeship: Łódź
- County: Łęczyca
- Gmina: Góra Świętej Małgorzaty

Zagaj [ˈzaɡai̯] is a village in the administrative district of Gmina Góra Świętej Małgorzaty, within Łęczyca County, Łódź Voivodeship, in central Poland.
