= Prusinowice, Łęczyca County =

Prusinowice
- Village
- Location within Poland
- Coordinates: 52°3′9″N 19°2′43″E
- Country: Poland
- Voivodeship: Łódź
- County: Łęczyca
- Gmina: Łęczyca

Prusinowice [pruɕinɔˈvit͡sɛ] is a village in the administrative district of Gmina Łęczyca, within Łęczyca County, Łódź Voivodeship, in central Poland.
