= Gmina Witonia =

Gmina Witonia Witonia Commune
- Gmina
- Interactive map of Gmina Witonia
- Coordinates (Witonia): 52°9′N 19°18′E
- Country: Poland
- Voivodeship: Łódź
- County: Łęczyca
- Seat: Witonia

Area
  - Total: 60.54 km^{2} (23.37 sq mi)

Population (2006)
  - Total: 3,510
  - Density: 58.0/km^{2} (150/sq mi)

Gmina Witonia is a rural gmina (administrative district) in Łęczyca County, Łódź Voivodeship, in central Poland. Its seat is the village of Witonia, which lies 14 kilometres (9 mi) north-east of Łęczyca and 43 km (27 mi) north of the regional capital Łódź.

The gmina covers an area of 60.54 square kilometres (23.4 sq mi), and its total population was 3,510 in 2006.

== Villages ==
Gmina Witonia contains the villages and settlements of Anusin, Budki Stare, Gajew, Gledzianów, Gledzianówek, Gołocice, Gozdków, Józefów, Józinki, Kostusin, Kuchary, Michały, Nędzerzew, Olesice, Oraczew, Romartów, Rudniki, Rybitwy, Stara Wargawa, Szamów, Uwielinek, Wargawka, Wargawka Młoda, Węglewice, Węglewice-Kolonia and Witonia.

== Neighbouring gminas ==
Gmina Witonia is bordered by the gminas of Daszyna, Góra Świętej Małgorzaty, Krzyżanów, Kutno and Łęczyca.
