= Kwiatkówek, Łódź Voivodeship =

Kwiatkówek
- Village
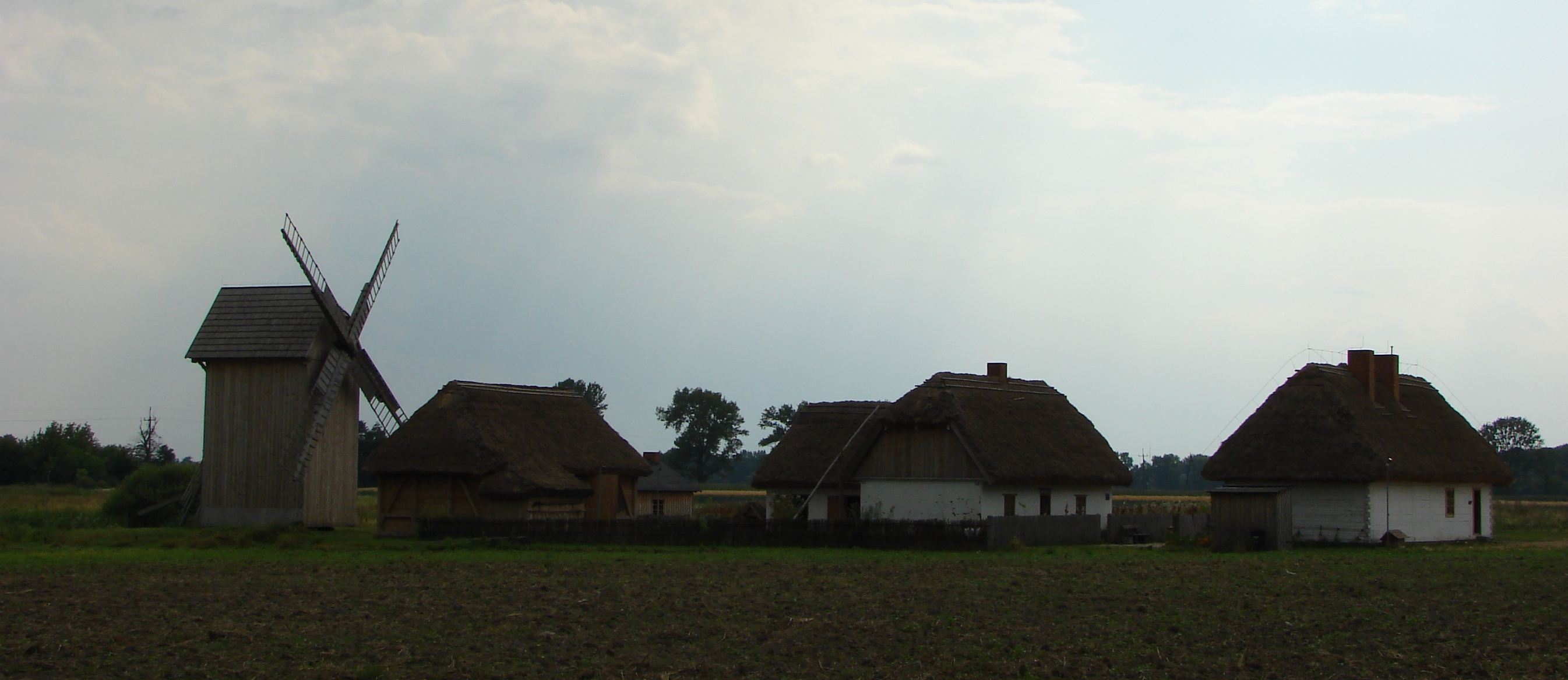
- Łęczyca Peasant Farm open-air museum

- Location within Poland
- Coordinates: 52°03′48″N 19°13′23″E
- Country: Poland
- Voivodeship: Łódź
- County: Łęczyca
- Gmina: Góra Świętej Małgorzaty

Kwiatkówek [kfjatˈkuvɛk] is a village in the administrative district of Gmina Góra Świętej Małgorzaty, within Łęczyca County, Łódź Voivodeship, in central Poland.

There is an open-air museum in the village (a branch of the Museum of Archaeology and Ethnography in Łódź). Łęczyca Peasant Farm features a number of traditional wooden buildings, including a windmill dating back to 1820.
