= Pavel Pototsky (engineer) =

Polish engineer (1879–1932)

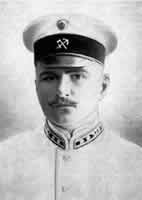
- Born: 1879; Saint Petersburg
- Died: March 15, 1932 (aged 52–53); Baku

Pavel Pototsky (1879 - 1932) was a Polish engineer, oil specialist, based in Baku. He initiated and oversaw the Bibiheybat Bay drying project. In 1929, Pototsky was awarded the first prize for the best construction work by the All-Union Exhibition of National Economic Achievements of the USSR, and in 1931 he was awarded the Order of Lenin.

== Life and activities ==
Pavel Pototsky was born in 1879 in St. Petersburg to a noble family. His father, Nikolai Pototsky, was a general and taught at the Mikhailovsky Military Academy in St. Petersburg. He appoints his son Paul to military service - he sends him to the Pajes Corps. But the young Paul wanted to be an engineer. Pavel Pototsky transferred to the Institute of Roads and Communications of the Pajes Corps and received a higher education. After graduating with honors in 1901, Pavel Pototsky traveled to the Netherlands to learn the intricacies of excavation. After returning from the Netherlands, Pototsky began working on the construction of a canal at the mouth of the Dnieper River in Kherson. There, Pavel is presented with a project, and he puts forward his project. As a result of the implementation of the project put forward by him, the work time is reduced by 2 times. Here it is possible to read Pototsky's name on the walls of the dam, which is visible during the withdrawal of water. He worked here until 1910, when he was invited to lead the filling of Bibiheybat Bay. In 1910, the Baku oil industry invited Pavel Pototsky, a well-educated and skilled engineer in excavation, to lead the filling of Bibiheybat Bay. He was asked to continue the work of Witold Zglenicki, another Polish engineer who died prematurely in 1904 and studied oil fields in Baku. Until then, nowhere in the world had wetlands been filled with soil. As early as the 1890s, Azerbaijan's oil industry asked the Tsarist government to allow them to exploit the waters of Bibiheybat Bay.

The main essence of this work was the construction of oil fields on the artificial lands to be created and drilling to the sea. For this purpose, at the insistence of P. Pototsky, in 1910 the Sormovo plant was commissioned to produce a caravan of drilling machines. This caravan was completed in 1916. The caravan consisted of 2 dump trucks with 1,100 horsepower, 5 tugboats with 1,100 horsepower, 10 barges with a capacity of 1,100 cubic meters and other facilities. Soils were removed from the seabed to fill the gulf. Local stones brought from Shikhov Cape and Nargin Island were used to strengthen the shores and build dams. However, the caravan was sent to the Baltic States for military purposes, before the work began. In 1918, only 193 hectares of land were filled with soil. Russian Civil War made it difficult to work in Bibiheybat Bay.

In August 1919, Pavel Pototsky lost one eye. Later, the other eye gradually lost its ability to see. In June 1920, Pototsky who had already lost 90% of his vision, had to go to Moscow for treatment of his eyes. Doctors were unable to bring the vision back to Pototsky's eyes. He was suffering from atrophy of the optic nerve and at the time there was no cure for this disease. As a result, at the age of 41, he lost the ability to see in both eyes.

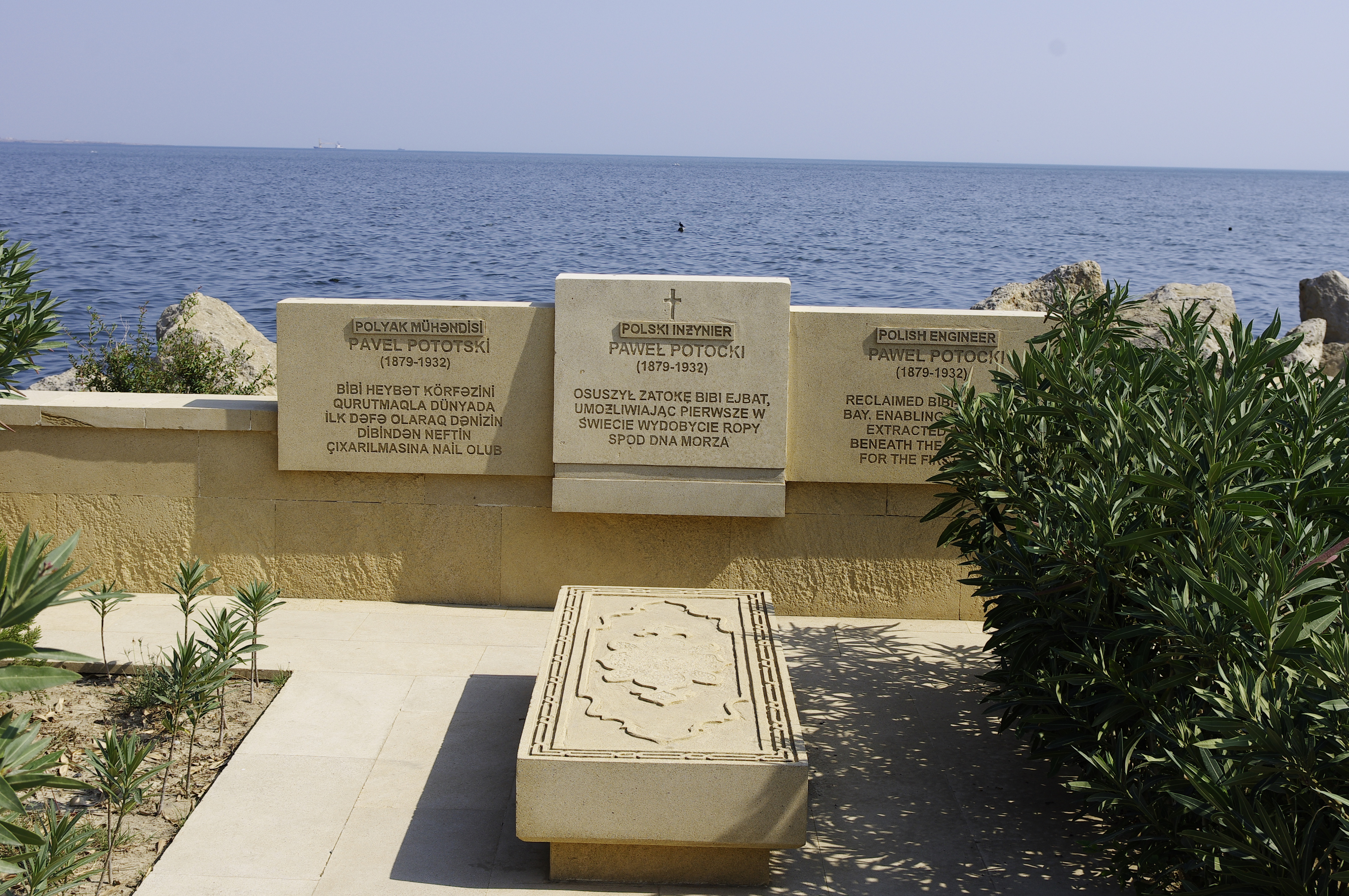
Pavel Pototsky's grave in Bibiheybat

Pototsky and his wife, Nadezhda Anatolyevna, then lived at 23 Boyuk Minaret alley in Baku. At that time, the Workers 'Cooperative - the Workers' Union was established opposite the house. And that union required an accountant. Losing his eyesight, Pototsky worked as an accountant here for some time. Following an order to continue work in Bibiheybat Bay, Azneft's head Serebrovsky offered Pototsky to take over the management of the bay. Although blind, in 1922 he developed a project to fill 27 hectares of sea area with soil. Soon Pototsky worked on a new project to fill the bay. According to this project, 79 hectares of land were to be poured. This work continues successfully, and on April 18, 1923, a 82.5-meter-deep well was drilled in Ilich Bay (Layer 3). The first oil fountain from a new area - a covered area - amazes the whole world and attracts great interest at international oil conferences.

In total, the fully covered area of Bibiheybat Bay has been increased to 300 hectares since 1910. Pototsky led the project for the last 10 years of his life, although he could not see. He was awarded the Order of Lenin for achieving his five-year plan two and a half years ahead of schedule.

Pavel Nikolayevich Pototsky died on March 15, 1932, and, according to his will, was buried in the earth-filled area of Bibiheybat, by the sea. The Gulf Filling Project, led by Pavel Pototsky, was completed in 1932 after his death.

== Memory ==
The work of the engineer inspired Margarita Aligeri and the poet dedicated her work "Old Man" to her.

Well-known Azerbaijani poet Ramiz Heydar dedicated a poem to him.

In the 1970s, director Eldar Guliyev's film "Ilich Bay" talked about filling the bay with Pototsky's unusual plan.

Maxim Gorky, who came to Baku in 1928, said about Pavel Pototsky:

We are in Bibiheybat, where the oilmen have taken part of the field from the sea to liberate the oil-producing lands from the sea. Very powerful pumps are pumping the turbid green water of the pond into the sea.To the sound of this non-poetic noise, I am told a legendary story - about an engineer, if I'm not mistaken, whose name was Pavel Pototsky. Even though he is completely blind, he is so familiar with the Bibiheybat area that he can accurately show on the map any area where work needs to be done or started.

Pototsky was buried by his will in Bibiheybat, on the shores of the sea he created, surrounded by oil pumps and drilling rigs. At the end of 2004, the tombstone was not in good condition. The headstone was broken, and the fence surrounding the tomb was almost destroyed. As a result of the efforts of the Embassy of the Republic of Poland in Baku, the grave was reconstructed with the funds provided by the Council for the Protection of Martyrdom and Struggle Memory. The author of the project is Rizvan Babayev, a sculptor who combines Polish and oriental elements. The restored tombstone was unveiled on November 9, 2005.

== See also ==
- Józef Płoszko
- Józef Gosławski
- Witold Zglenicki
