= Leszcze, Łódź Voivodeship =

Leszcze
- Village
- Location within Poland
- Coordinates: 52°3′34″N 19°10′18″E
- Country: Poland
- Voivodeship: Łódź
- County: Łęczyca
- Gmina: Łęczyca

Leszcze [ˈlɛʂt͡ʂɛ] is a village in the administrative district of Gmina Łęczyca, within Łęczyca County, Łódź Voivodeship, in central Poland.
