= Topola Królewska =

- Village
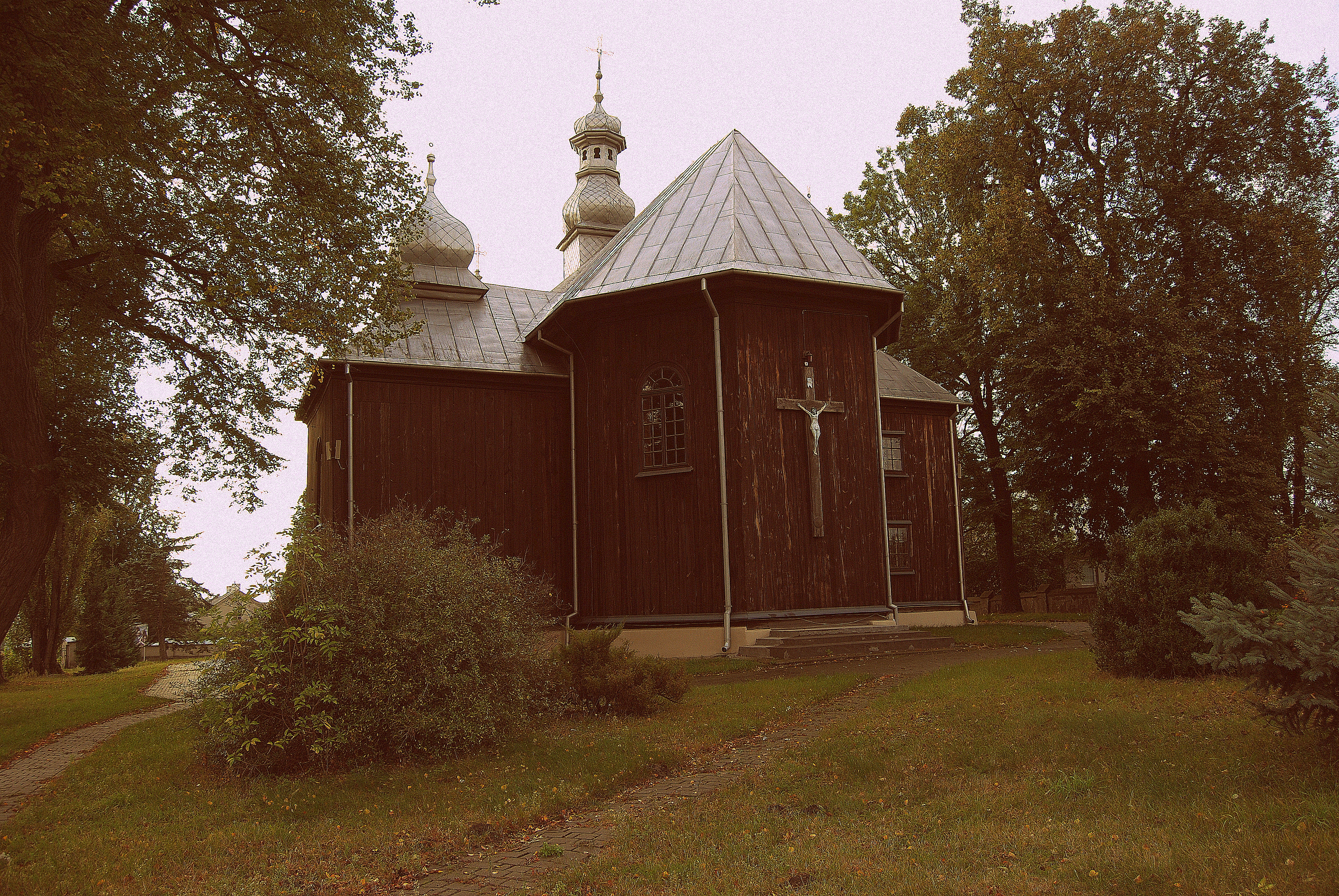
- Catholic church

- Location within Poland
- Coordinates: 52°5′N 19°12′E
- Country: Poland
- Voivodeship: Łódź
- County: Łęczyca
- Gmina: Łęczyca

Topola Królewska [tɔˈpɔla kruˈlɛfska] is a village in the administrative district of Gmina Łęczyca, within Łęczyca County, Łódź Voivodeship, in central Poland.
