= Witonia =

- Village
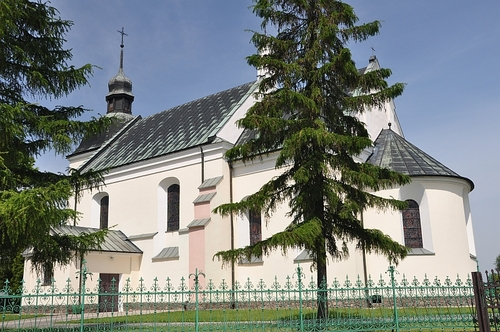
- Catholic church

- Location within Poland
- Coordinates: 52°9′N 19°18′E
- Country: Poland
- Voivodeship: Łódź
- County: Łęczyca
- Gmina: Witonia
- Population: 1,130

Witonia [viˈtɔɲa] is a village in Łęczyca County, Łódź Voivodeship, in central Poland. It is the seat of the gmina (administrative district) called Gmina Witonia.
