= Nova Topola, Lebane =

Nova Topola Нова Топола (Serbian)
- Village
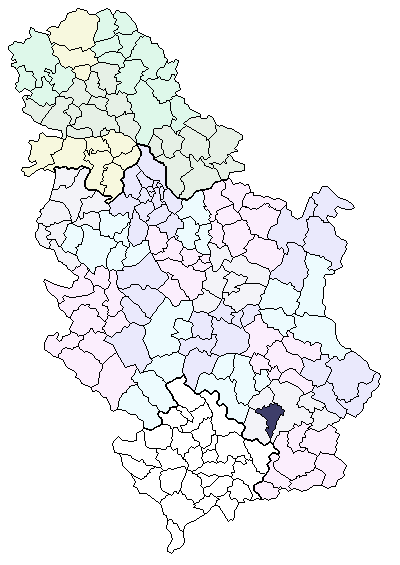
- Location of the municipality of Lebane in Serbia

- Location within Serbia
- Country: Serbia
- District: Jablanica District
- Municipality: Lebane

Population (2002)
  - Total: 121
- Time zone: UTC+1 (CET)
  - Summer (DST): UTC+2 (CEST)

Nova Topola is a village in the municipality of Lebane, Serbia. According to the 2002 census, the village had a population of 121 people.
