= Topla =

Topla may refer to:

- Topla, Nadia, a village in West Bengal, India
- Topla, Črna na Koroškem, a village in northern Slovenia
- Topla, Bor, a village in Serbia
- Topla, Herceg Novi, a village in Herceg Novi Municipality, Montenegro
- Topla monastery, near Herceg Novi, Montenegro
- Topla, a village in Cornereva Commune, Caraș-Severin County, Romania
- Topla, a village in Mănăștiur Commune, Timiș County, Romania
- Topľa, river in eastern Slovakia
- Topla (river), river in western Romania
