= Bibiheybət =

Bibiheybat
- Municipality
- Azerbaijani: Bibiheybət
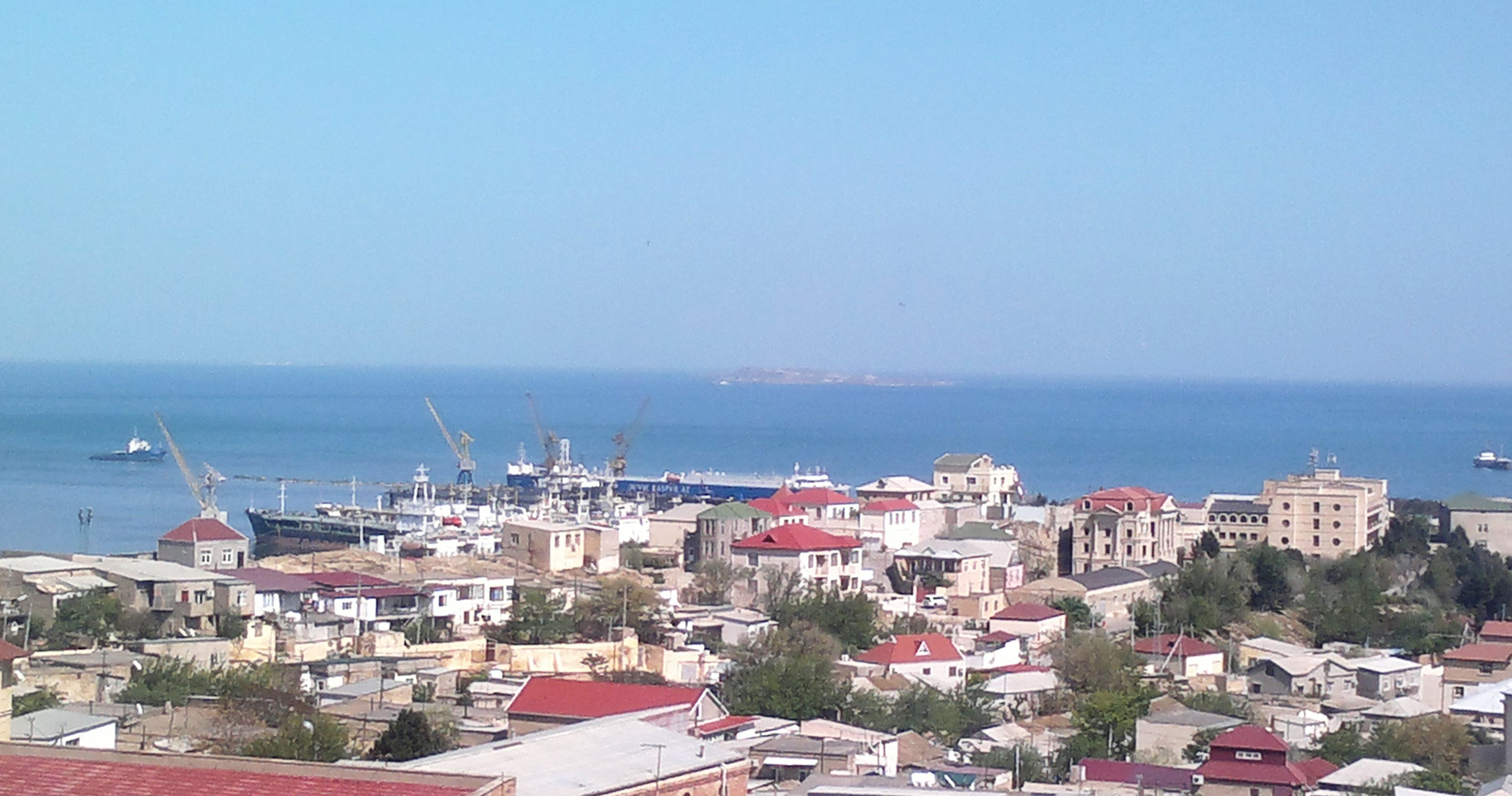

- Location within Azerbaijan
- Coordinates: 40°18′24″N 49°49′21″E
- Country: Azerbaijan
- City: Baku
- District: Sabail

Population (2008)
  - Total: 1,451
- Time zone: UTC+4 (AZT)
  - Summer (DST): UTC+5 (AZT)

Bibiheybət (also, Bibiheybat, Bibiheibat, Bibi-Heybat, Bibi-Heibat; formerly known as Khanlar, Euwbet, and Shikhovo) is a municipality in Baku, Azerbaijan. It has a population of 1,451.

In 1846, the Russians drilled an exploratory oil well to a depth of 21 m. It was the first oil well in the world that was drilled instead of dug by hand. In the 1890s, a large oil field was discovered offshore, which led to land reclamation in 1924 to produce the field. Pavel Pototsky was one of the prime founders of the oil bay around Bibiheybat.

In 2007, as part of the expansion of the Bibiheybat Motorway and the reconstruction of the Bibiheybat Mosque, dozens of families were relocated to new, modern homes. Alongside these developments, a stadium, a kindergarten, and other facilities were also rebuilt. A recreational park was created around the newly renovated stadium to offer the local community a space for cultural and leisure activities.

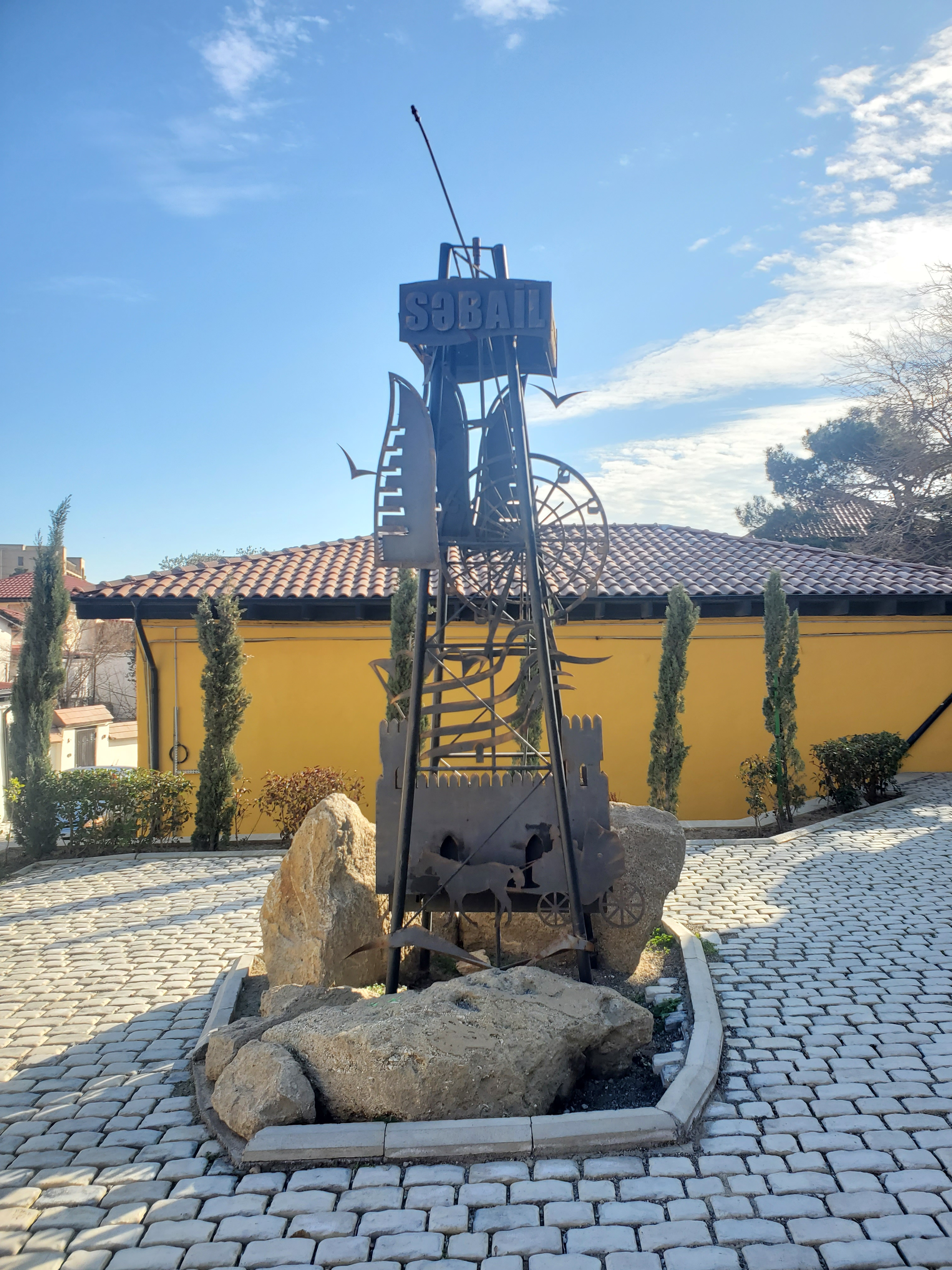
Bibiheybat 2023

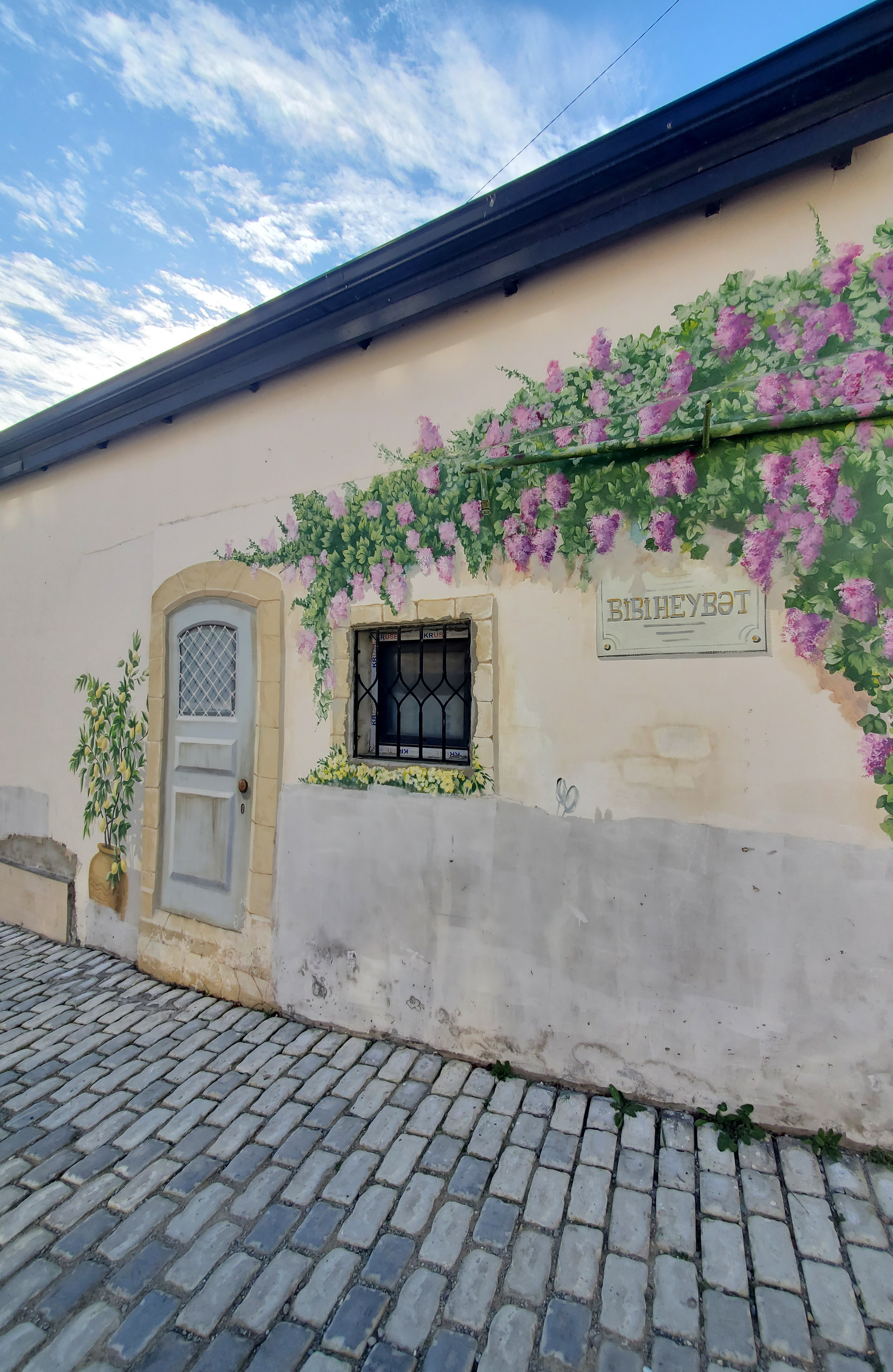
Bibiheybat 2023

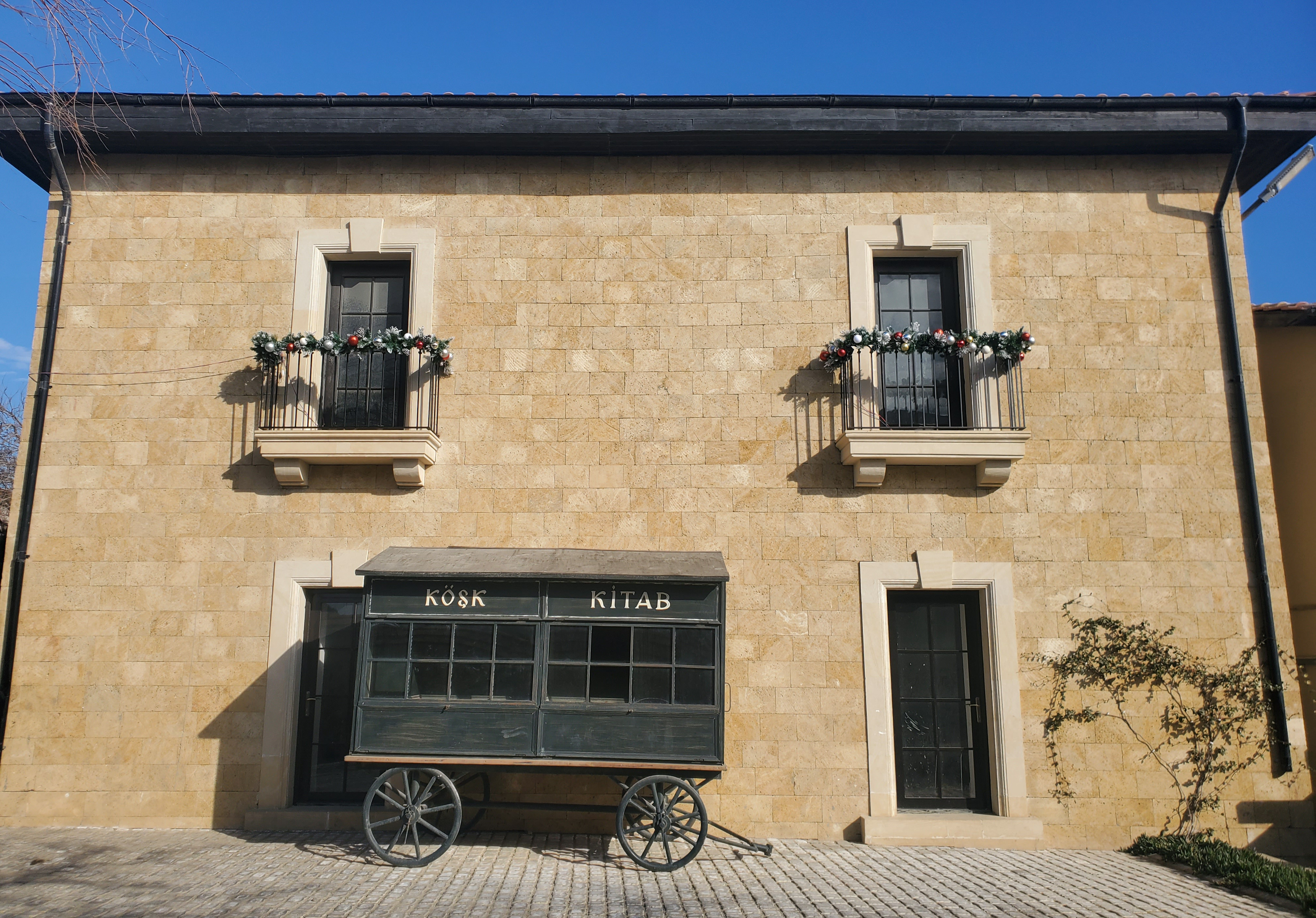
Bibiheybat 2023

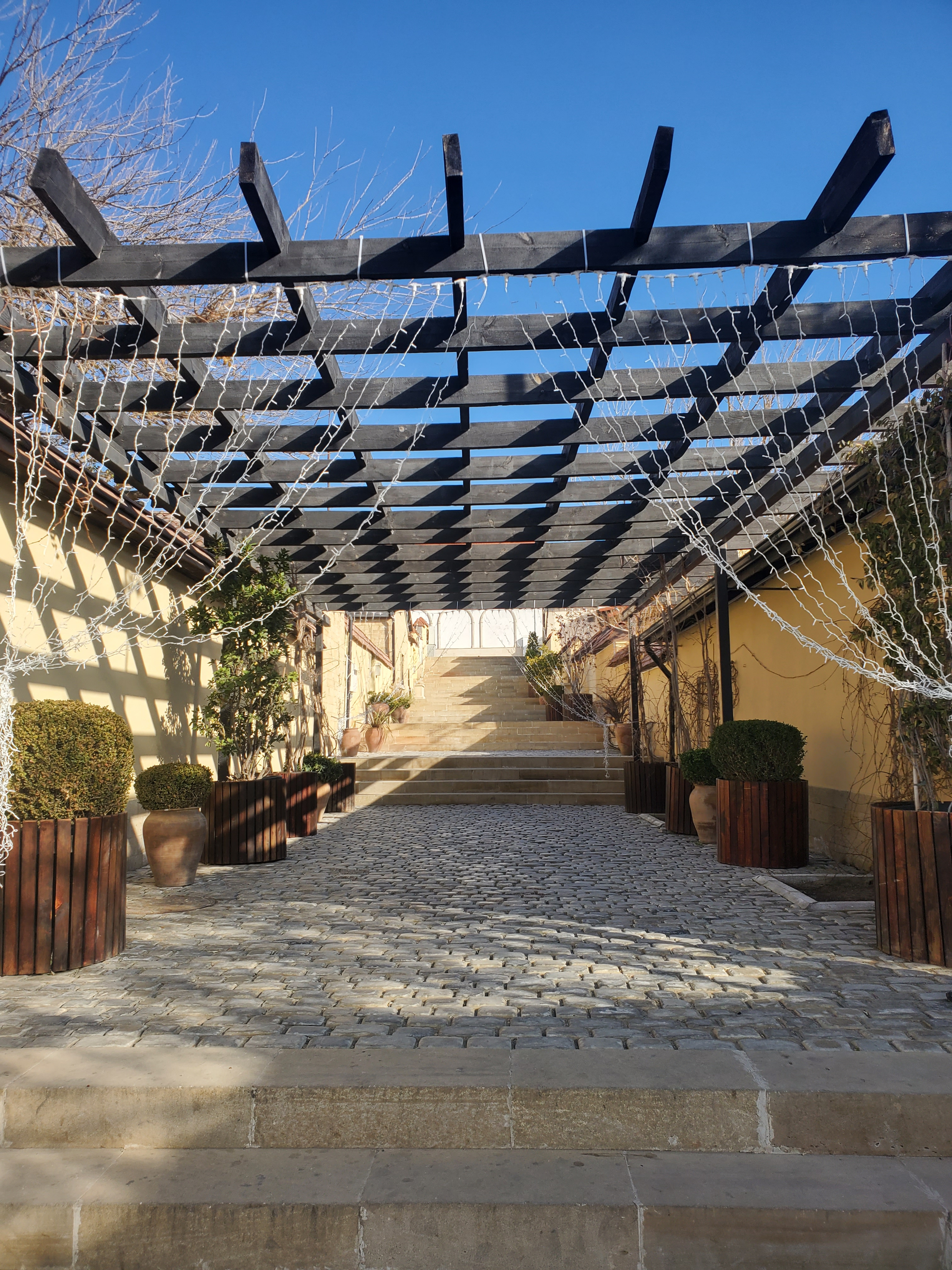
Bibiheybat 2023

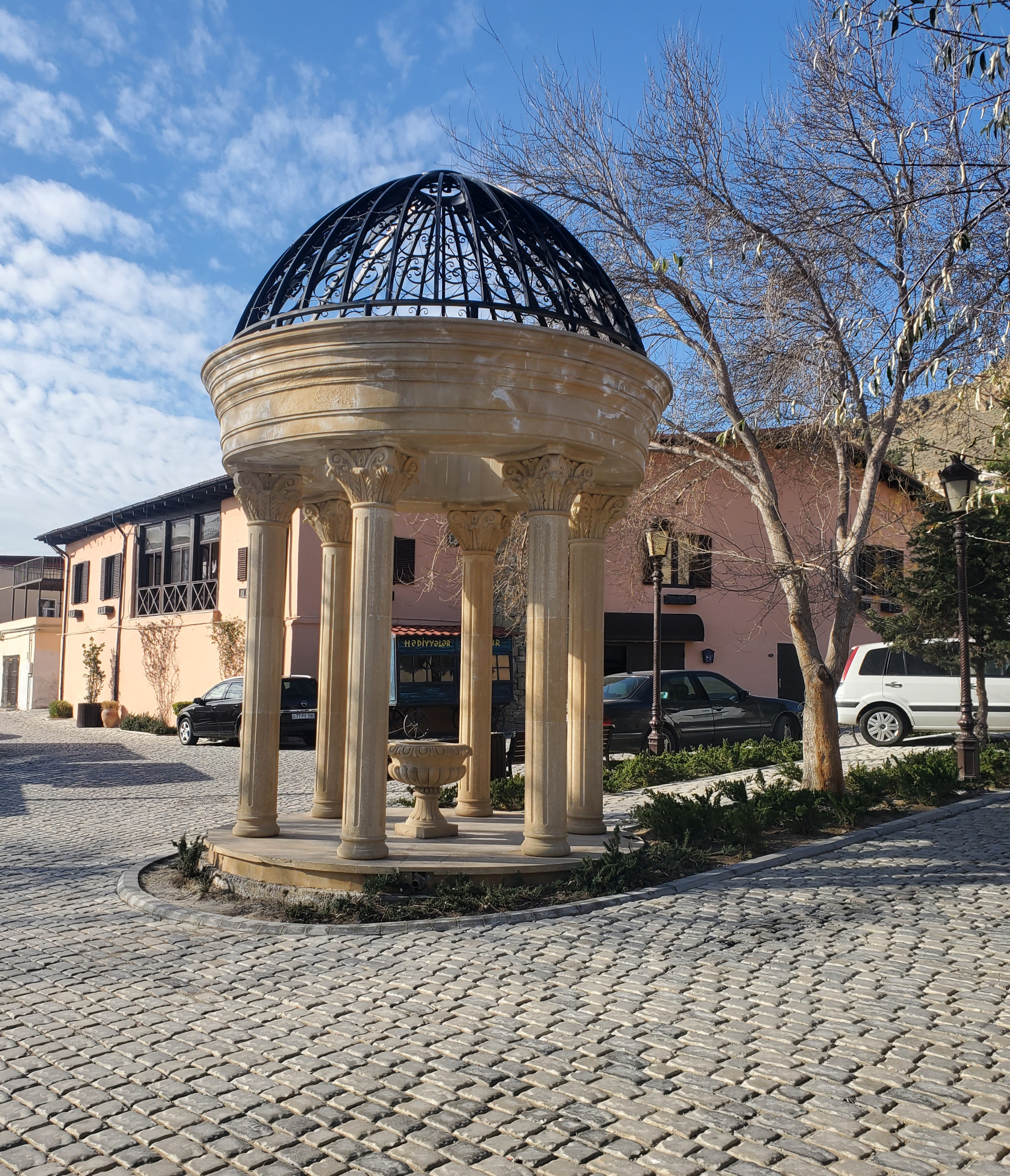
Bibiheybat 2023

== Places of interest ==
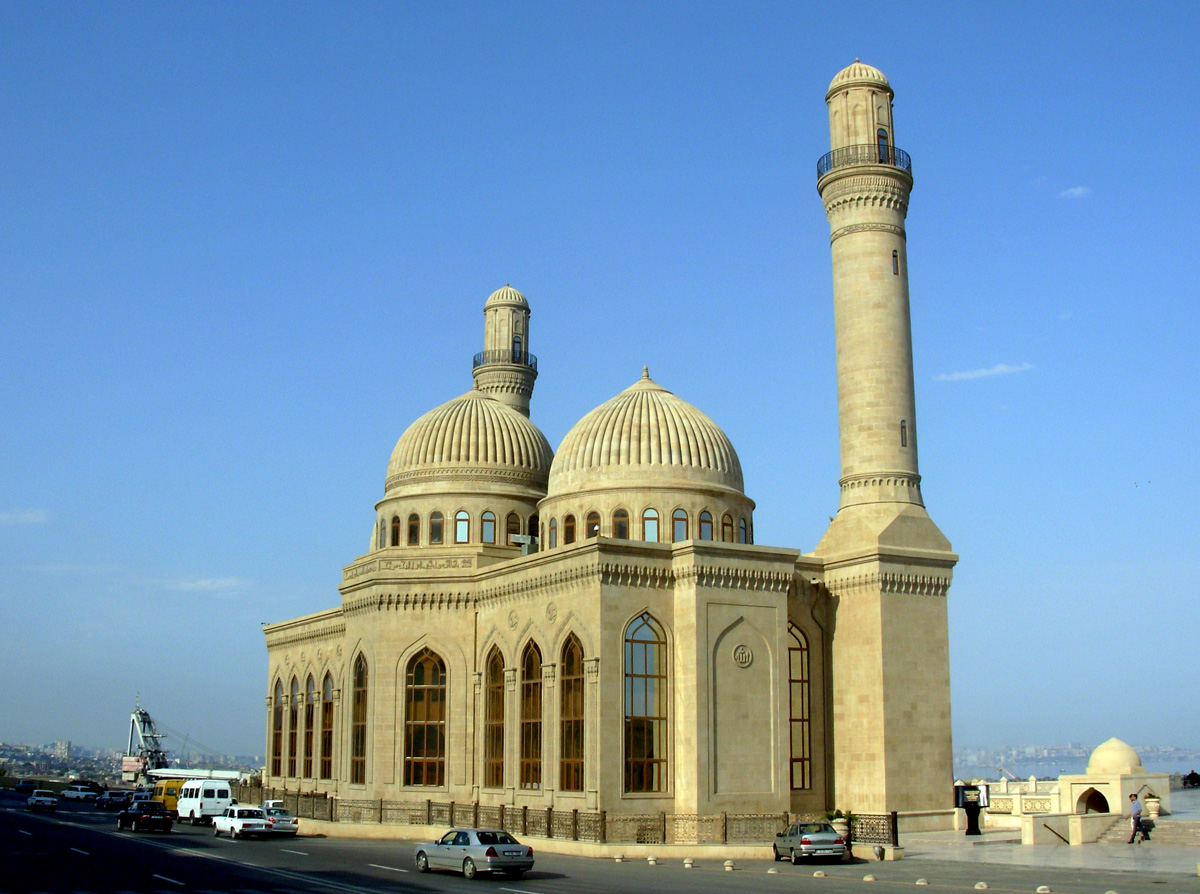
Bibi Heybat Mosque

- Bibi-Heybat Mosque

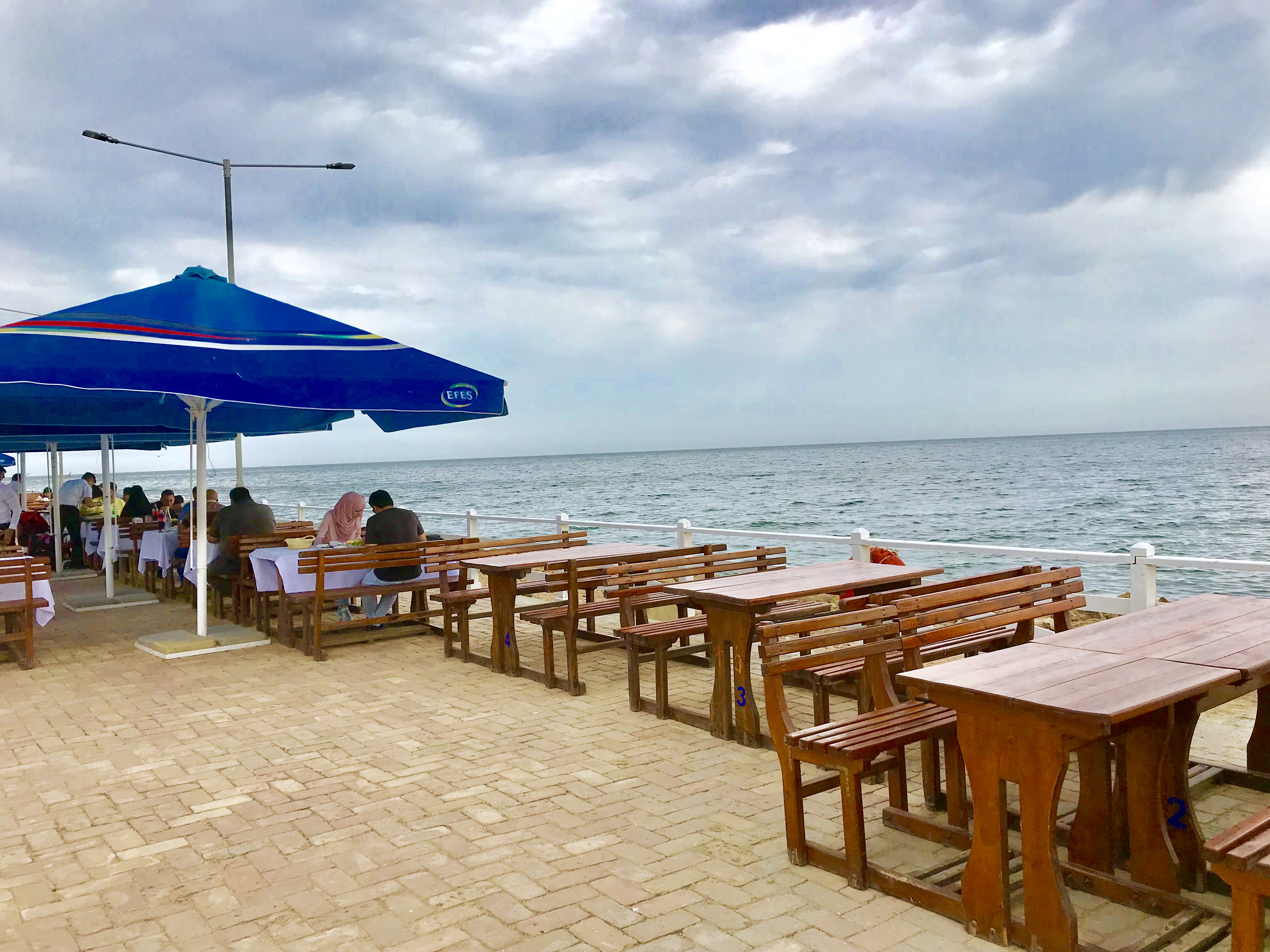
One of the Sea Food Restaurants in Bibiheybet

== Transportation ==
=== Road ===
E60 Highway by pass Bibiheybat.

=== Metro ===
The Bibiheybet Metro Station is planned in this area by Baku Metro in the future.

== See also ==
- Petroleum industry in Azerbaijan
