= Wola Kiełpińska =

- Village
- Location within Poland
- Coordinates: 52°29′57″N 20°59′29″E
- Country: Poland
- Voivodeship: Masovian
- County: Legionowo
- Gmina: Serock
- Population: 80

Wola Kiełpińska [ˈvɔla kʲɛu̯ˈpiɲska] is a village in the administrative district of Gmina Serock, within Legionowo County, Masovian Voivodeship, in east-central Poland.
