= Kosin Hembut =

Thai footballer

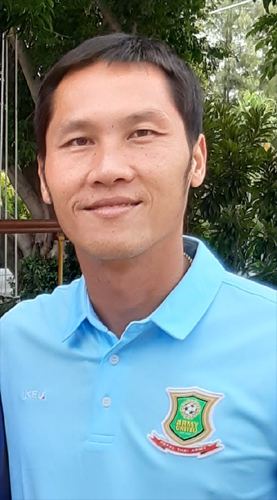

Personal information
- Full name: Kosin Hembut
- Date of birth: 4 April 1982 (age 44)
- Place of birth: Kanchanaburi, Thailand
- Height: 1.92 m (6 ft 3 1/2 in)
- Position: Goalkeeper

Team information
- Current team: Maejo United
- Number: 30

Youth career
- Wat Suthiwararam School

Senior career*
| Years | Team | Apps | (Gls) |
| 2002–2009 | Army United | 37 | (0) |
| 2010 | Rajnavy | 12 | (0) |
| 2011 | Chiangmai | 10 | (0) |
| 2011–2012 | Army United | 23 | (0) |
| 2013 | Suphanburi | 12 | (0) |
| 2014–2017 | Army United | 7 | (0) |
| 2014 | → Air Force Central (loan) | 13 | (0) |
| 2017 | → Khon Kaen (loan) | 16 | (0) |
| 2018 | Krabi | 0 | (0) |
| 2019 | Army United | 5 | (0) |
| 2020 | Lamphun Warrior | 0 | (0) |
| 2020 | Kanchanaburi | 1 | (0) |
| 2021– | Maejo United | 0 | (0) |

International career^{‡}
| 1998–1999 | Thailand U17 | | |
- * Club domestic league appearances and goals as of October 24, 2021 ‡ National team caps and goals as of January 15, 2011

Kosin Hembut (Thai: โกสินทร์ เหมบุตร, born April 4, 1982) simply known as Sin (Thai: สิน), is a Thai professional footballer who plays as a goalkeeper.

== Honours ==
=== Club ===
Army United

- Thai Division 1 League: 2004-05
