= Łęczyca County =

Łęczyca County Powiat łęczycki
- County
- Flag Coat of arms

- Location within the voivodeship
- Coordinates (Łęczyca): 52°3′N 19°12′E
- Country: Poland
- Voivodeship: Łódź
- Seat: Łęczyca
- Gminas: Total 8 (incl. 1 urban): Łęczyca; Gmina Daszyna; Gmina Góra Świętej Małgorzaty; Gmina Grabów; Gmina Łęczyca; Gmina Piątek; Gmina Świnice Warckie; Gmina Witonia

Area
  - Total: 774 km^{2} (299 sq mi)

Population (2006)
  - Total: 53,435
  - Density: 69.0/km^{2} (179/sq mi)
  - Urban: 15,423
  - Rural: 38,012
- Car plates: ELE
- Website: www.leczyca.pl

Łęczyca County (Polish: powiat łęczycki) is a unit of territorial administration and local government (powiat) in Łódź Voivodeship, central Poland. It came into being on January 1, 1999, as a result of the Polish local government reforms in 1998. Its administrative seat and only town is Łęczyca, which lies 35 kilometres (22 mi) north-west of the regional capital Łódź.

The county covers an area of 774 square kilometres (298.8 sq mi). As of 2006, its total population was 53,435, out of which the population of Łęczyca was 15,423 and the rural population was 38,012.

== Neighbouring counties ==
Łęczyca County is bordered by Kutno County to the north, Łowicz County to the east, Zgierz County to the south-east, Poddębice County to the south-west and Koło County to the west.

== Administrative divisions ==
The county is subdivided into eight gminas (one urban and seven rural). These are listed in the following table, in descending order of population.

Gmina	Type	Area (km^{2})	Population (2006)	Seat
Łęczyca	urban	9.0	15,423	
Gmina Łęczyca	rural	150.8	8,549	Łęczyca *
Gmina Piątek	urban-rural	133.2	6,574	Piątek
Gmina Grabów	rural	154.8	6,480	Grabów
Gmina Góra Świętej Małgorzaty	rural	90.4	4,578	Góra Świętej Małgorzaty
Gmina Daszyna	rural	81.0	4,207	Daszyna
Gmina Świnice Warckie	rural	94.0	4,114	Świnice Warckie
Gmina Witonia	rural	60.5	3,510	Witonia
* seat not part of the gmina
