= Drozdov =

Drozdov may refer to:

- Drozdov (surname)
- Drozdov (Beroun District), a municipality and village in the Czech Republic
- Drozdov (Šumperk District), a municipality and village in the Czech Republic
- Vladimir Drozdov, Russian-American pianist and composer
- 18334 Drozdov, main-belt asteroid

== See also ==
- Drozdów (disambiguation)
