= Chęciński =

Chęciński, feminine: Chęcińska is a Polish surname literally meaning someone from Chęcin. Notable people with the surname include:

- Arkadiusz Chęciński (born 1971), Polish politician
- Christine Checinska, British Jamaican womenswear designer, curator and art historian
- Czesław Chęciński (1851–1916), Polish physician and pathologist, known for research in malaria
- Paweł Chęciński, Polish pianist
- Sylwester Chęciński (1930–2021), Polish film and television director
