= Władysławów =

Władysławów may refer to:

- Former Polish name for Kudirkos Naumiestis in Lithuania
- Władysławów, Gmina Tuczna, Biała County in Lublin Voivodeship (east Poland)
- Władysławów, Chełm County in Lublin Voivodeship (east Poland)
- Władysławów, Janów County in Lublin Voivodeship (east Poland)
- Władysławów, Łuków County in Lublin Voivodeship (east Poland)
- Władysławów, Parczew County in Lublin Voivodeship (east Poland)
- Władysławów, Kutno County in Łódź Voivodeship (central Poland)
- Władysławów, Łęczyca County in Łódź Voivodeship (central Poland)
- Władysławów, Pabianice County in Łódź Voivodeship (central Poland)
- Władysławów, Piotrków County in Łódź Voivodeship (central Poland)
- Władysławów, Rawa County in Łódź Voivodeship (central Poland)
- Władysławów, Gmina Żelechlinek, Tomaszów County in Łódź Voivodeship (central Poland)
- Władysławów, Zgierz County in Łódź Voivodeship (central Poland)
- Władysławów, Gmina Garwolin in Masovian Voivodeship (east-central Poland)
- Władysławów, Gmina Żelechów in Masovian Voivodeship (east-central Poland)
- Władysławów, Gmina Żabia Wola, Grodzisk County in Masovian Voivodeship (east-central Poland)
- Władysławów, Łosice County in Masovian Voivodeship (east-central Poland)
- Władysławów, Otwock County in Masovian Voivodeship (east-central Poland)
- Władysławów, Piaseczno County in Masovian Voivodeship (east-central Poland)
- Władysławów, Płock County in Masovian Voivodeship (east-central Poland)
- Władysławów, Przysucha County in Masovian Voivodeship (east-central Poland)
- Władysławów, Gmina Iłów in Masovian Voivodeship (east-central Poland)
- Władysławów, Gmina Sochaczew in Masovian Voivodeship (east-central Poland)
- Władysławów, Zwoleń County in Masovian Voivodeship (east-central Poland)
- Władysławów, Żyrardów County in Masovian Voivodeship (east-central Poland)
- Władysławów, Greater Poland Voivodeship (west-central Poland)
- Władysławów, Silesian Voivodeship (south Poland)
