= Drozdowski =

Pilawa coat of arms used by some of Drozdowski family

Drozdowski (feminine Drozdowska ) is a Polish surname, toponymic derived from one of placenames derived from the bird name "Drozd" (Thrush (bird)): Drozdowo, Drozdów or Drozdy. Some of them use Jelita, Korab, Korwin, Pobóg, Pilawa or Prus coat of arms. It may be transliterated as: Drosdowski, Drożdowski, Drozdovski, Drozdovsky, Drozdovskyi, Drozdovskij, Drozdovskis. Notable people with the surname include:

- Andrzej Drozdowski (born 1950), Polish footballer
- Antoni Drozdowski (1760–1833), Polish–Lithuanian priest and poet
- Beata Drozdowska (born 1984), Polish Paralympic swimmer
- Bohdan Drozdowski (1931–2013), Polish poet, prose writer, journalist, publicist, translator, and author of stage plays
- Dmytro Drozdovskyi (born 1987), Ukrainian scientist, literary critic, writer, editor, and translator
- Jan Drozdowski (1857–1918), Polish pianist and music teacher
- Kacper Drozdowski (born 1996), Polish chess player
- Mikhail Drozdovsky (1881–1919), Russian army general and one of the military leaders of the anti-Bolshevik White movement
- Yuri Drozdovskij (born 1984) is a Ukrainian chess player

== See also ==
- Drozdovsky's March
- Drozd (surname)
- Drozda
- Drozdov (surname)
