= Podłęże =

Podłęże may refer to the following places:

- Podłęże, Chrzanów County in Lesser Poland Voivodeship (south Poland)
- Podłęże, Wieliczka County in Lesser Poland Voivodeship (south Poland)
- Podłęże, Łódź Voivodeship (central Poland)
- Podłęże, Świętokrzyskie Voivodeship (south-central Poland)
