= Drazdauskas =

- Lithuanian surname
- m.: Drazdauskas
- f.: (unmarried): Drazdauskaitė
- f.: (married): Drazdauskienė
- Related names: Drozdowski

Drazdauskas is a Lithuanian surname. Notable people with the surname include:

- Kęstutis Drazdauskas (born 1970), Lithuanian music producer, film director, actor and musician
- Rasa Drazdauskaitė, Lithuanian long-distance runner
- Valys Drazdauskas (1906–1981), Lithuanian literary critic, translator, journalist, editor
