= Drozd (disambiguation) =

Drozd is an anti-missile active protection system developed in the Soviet Union.

Drozd may also refer to:

- Drozd (surname)
