= Świnice Warckie =

- Village
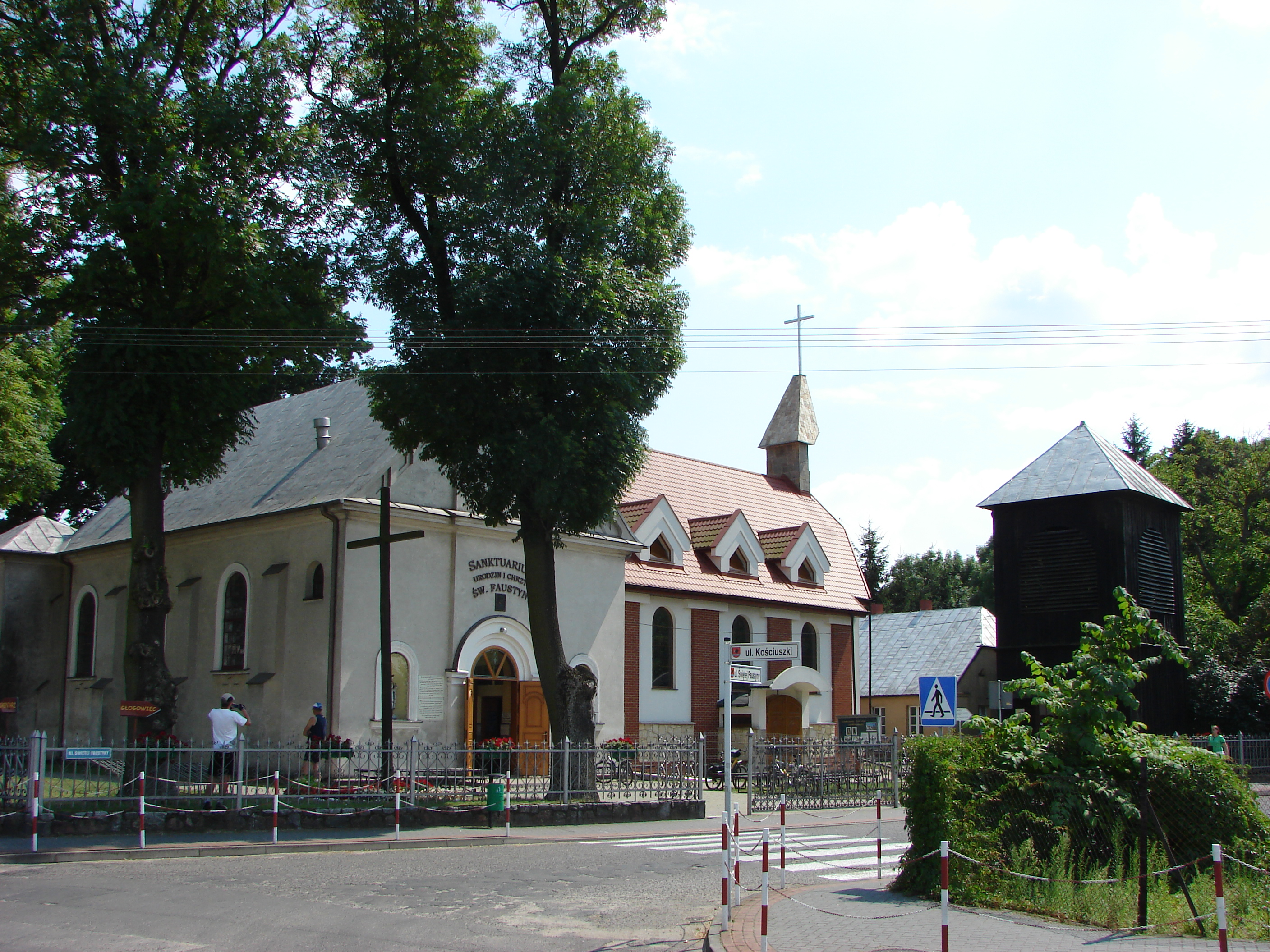
- Church of Saint Casimir, built 1859.

- Location within Poland
- Coordinates: 52°2′N 18°55′E
- Country: Poland
- Voivodeship: Łódź
- County: Łęczyca
- Gmina: Świnice Warckie
- Population (approx.): 920

Świnice Warckie [ɕfiˈnit͡sɛ ˈvart͡skʲɛ] is a village in Łęczyca County, Łódź Voivodeship, in central Poland. It is the seat of the gmina (administrative district) called Gmina Świnice Warckie.

The village has an approximate population of 920. This is the place of the baptism and first communion of Faustina Kowalska, a great mystic and the secretary of Divine Mercy. The parish church is an official sanctuary since 2002. Saint Faustina (born Helena Kowalska) was living until the age of 16 in nearby village of Głogowiec.
