= Drozd (surname) =

Drozd (Czech and Slovak feminine: Drozdová) is a Slavic surname. The word means 'thrush' in Belarusian, Czech, Polish, Russian, Serbo-Croatian, Slovak and Ukrainian. Other Slavic surnames derived from drozd include Drozda, Drozdowski and Drozdov. Notable people with the surname include:

- Grigory Drozd (born 1979), Russian boxer
- Jarosław Drozd (born 1955), Polish politologist and diplomat
- Luba Drozd (born 1982), Ukrainian-American installation artist
- Pavel Drozd (born 1995), Russian ice dancer
- Peter Drozd (born 1973), Czech footballer
- Ryszard Drozd (1934–2012), Polish chess master
- Seb Drozd (born 2003), English footballer
- Sergei Drozd (born 1990), Belarusian ice hockey player
- Steven Drozd (born 1969), American musician
- Valentin Drozd (1906–1943), Soviet admiral
- Yuriy Drozd (born 1944), Ukrainian mathematician
