= Strachów =

Strachów may refer to the following places in Poland:

- Strachów, Strzelin County in Lower Silesian Voivodeship (south-west Poland)
- Strachów, Wrocław County in Lower Silesian Voivodeship (south-west Poland)
- Strachów, Łódź Voivodeship (central Poland)
- Strachów, Masovian Voivodeship (east-central Poland)
