= Edmund Chojecki =

Polish writer (1822–1899)

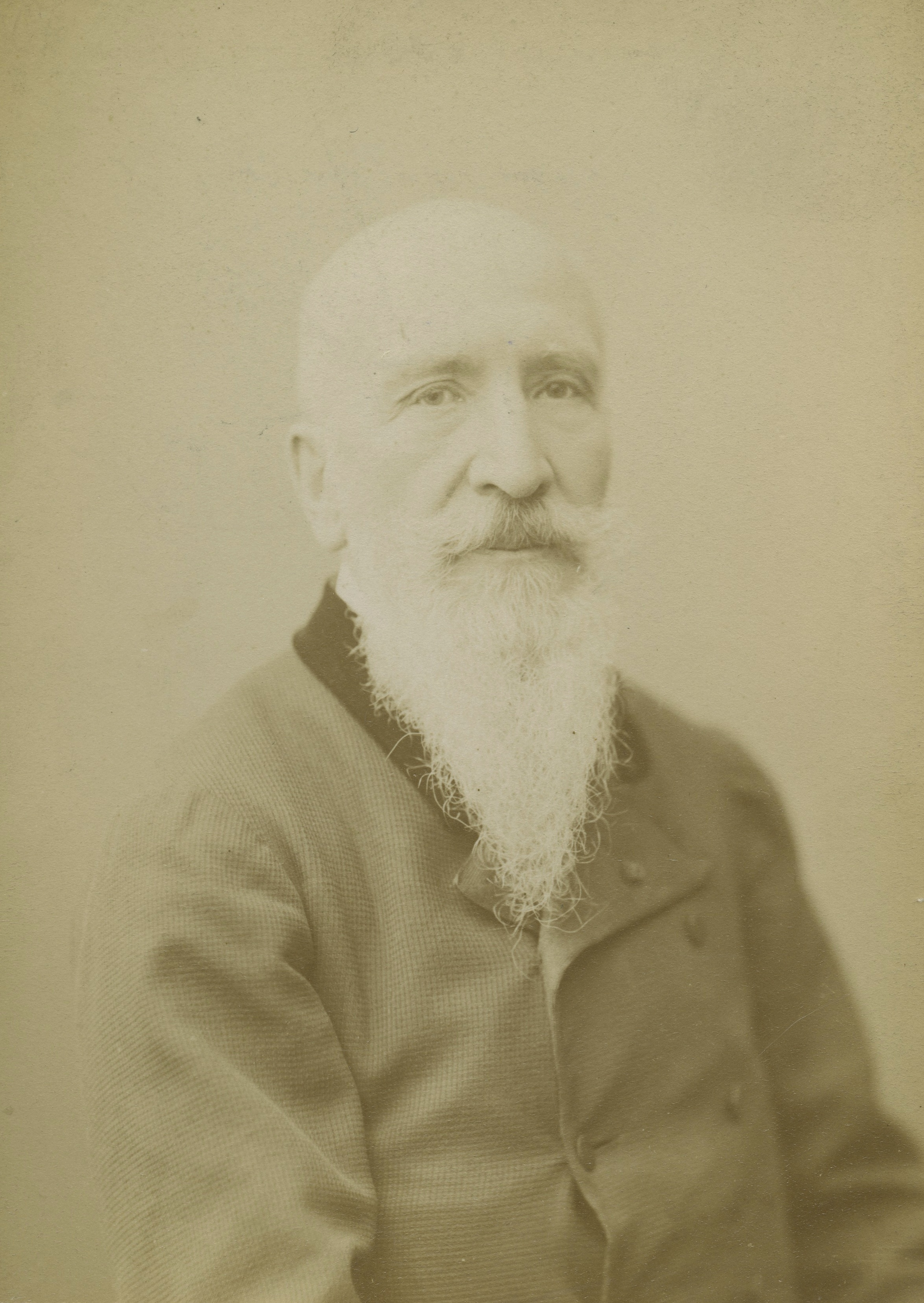
- Born: Edmund Franciszek Maurycy Chojecki; 15 October 1822; Wiski, Podlasie, Congress Poland
- Died: 1 December 1899 (aged 77); Paris, France
- Occupations: Novelist, Journalist and Playwright
- Writing career
- Language: Polish, French
- Period: 19th century

Edmund Franciszek Maurycy Chojecki (Polish pronunciation: [xɔˈjɛt͡skʲi]; Wiski, Podlasie, 15 October 1822 – 1 December 1899, Paris) was a Polish journalist, playwright, novelist, poet and translator. Originally hailing from Warsaw, from 1844 he resided in France, where he wrote under the pen name Charles Edmond.

Early on, Chojecki participated in leftist intellectual and political movements and edited Polish poet Adam Mickiewicz's political weekly magazine La Tribune des Peuples (The Peoples' Tribune). In time he entered elite Parisian learned and literary circles, became secretary to Emperor Napoleon III, and co-founded the Paris daily Le Temps, predecessor to Le Monde.

Chojecki wrote a notable Polish-language novel, Alkhadar (1854), and translated into Polish (1847) Jan Potocki's celebrated novel, The Saragossa Manuscript.

== Life ==
Edmund Chojecki spent his youth in Warsaw, where his leftist political views crystallized. He was a friend of the poet Cyprian Norwid, wrote for the monthly Przegląd Warszawski (The Warsaw Review), Echo (The Echo) and the monthly Biblioteka Warszawska (The Warsaw Library, 1840–42), and was secretary of the Board of Directors of the Warsaw Theaters (Dyrekcja Warszawskich Teatrów).

In 1844 Chojecki moved to France and after 1845 became active in European leftist movements. In 1846 he wrote Czechja i Czechowie (Czechia and the Czechs), a book about the history of the Czech lands. In 1848 he took part in a Slavic congress in Prague and was expelled for radicalism. In 1849 he became editor of La Tribune des Peuples (The Peoples' Tribune), a Polish-led French-language radical romantic-nationalist political weekly magazine that had been founded by the Polish poet Adam Mickiewicz. In this capacity, Chojecki came into contact with many prominent Russian and German émigrés. His La Tribune des Peuples was published in Paris between March and November 1849, with a hiatus (14 April – 31 August 1849) caused by censorship. Chojecki also wrote for the progressive Revue Indépendante (Independent Review), co-edited by George Sand, and for the socialist newspaper La Voix du Peuple (The Voice of the People). For his pains, he was expelled from France. He visited Egypt, Turkey (where he enlisted in the army during the Crimean War) and Iceland (where he went as secretary to Prince Louis Napoleon).

Until the 1850s, e.g. in Rewolucjoniści i stronnictwo wsteczne w r. 1848 (The Revolutionaries and the Reactionaries in 1848, published in 1849), Chojecki had promoted revolutionary-democratic and utopian-socialist ideas.

In time, he entered elite Parisian learned and literary circles. In 1856 he became secretary to Louis Napoleon, who in 1852 had become Emperor Napoleon III of France. In 1861 Chojecki co-founded the Paris daily, Le Temps, predecessor to France's most popular modern newspaper, Le Monde. He became director of the Senate Library. In later years, as a French citizen, he wrote novels and plays under the pen name "Charles Edmond" and enjoyed the friendship of the Goncourt brothers and Gustave Flaubert.

Chojecki is remembered in the history of Polish literature as the author of a fine realistic novel, Alkhadar (1854), about the vicissitudes of a romantic conspirator against the backdrop of Polish Galicia's landed gentry, which was being brought to ruin by capitalism.

Chojecki also translated into Polish many French-language works, including (in 1847) the novel The Saragossa Manuscript by the Polish polymath aristocrat Jan Potocki. After sections of Potocki's novel had been lost (other fragments having been published as separate parts in 1804 and 1813–14), the missing sections were restored by back-translation into French from Chojecki's Polish translation.

== See also ==
- List of Poles
- Translation
