= Wyganów =

Wyganów may refer to the following places:

- Wyganów, Greater Poland Voivodeship (west-central Poland)
- Wyganów, Łódź Voivodeship (central Poland)
- Wyganów, West Pomeranian Voivodeship (north-west Poland)
