= Kraski, Łódź Voivodeship =

Kraski
- Village
- Location within Poland
- Coordinates: 52°2′38″N 18°54′7″E
- Country: Poland
- Voivodeship: Łódź
- County: Łęczyca
- Gmina: Świnice Warckie

Kraski [ˈkraski] is a village in the administrative district of Gmina Świnice Warckie, within Łęczyca County, Łódź Voivodeship, in central Poland.
