= Choroszczynka =

- Village
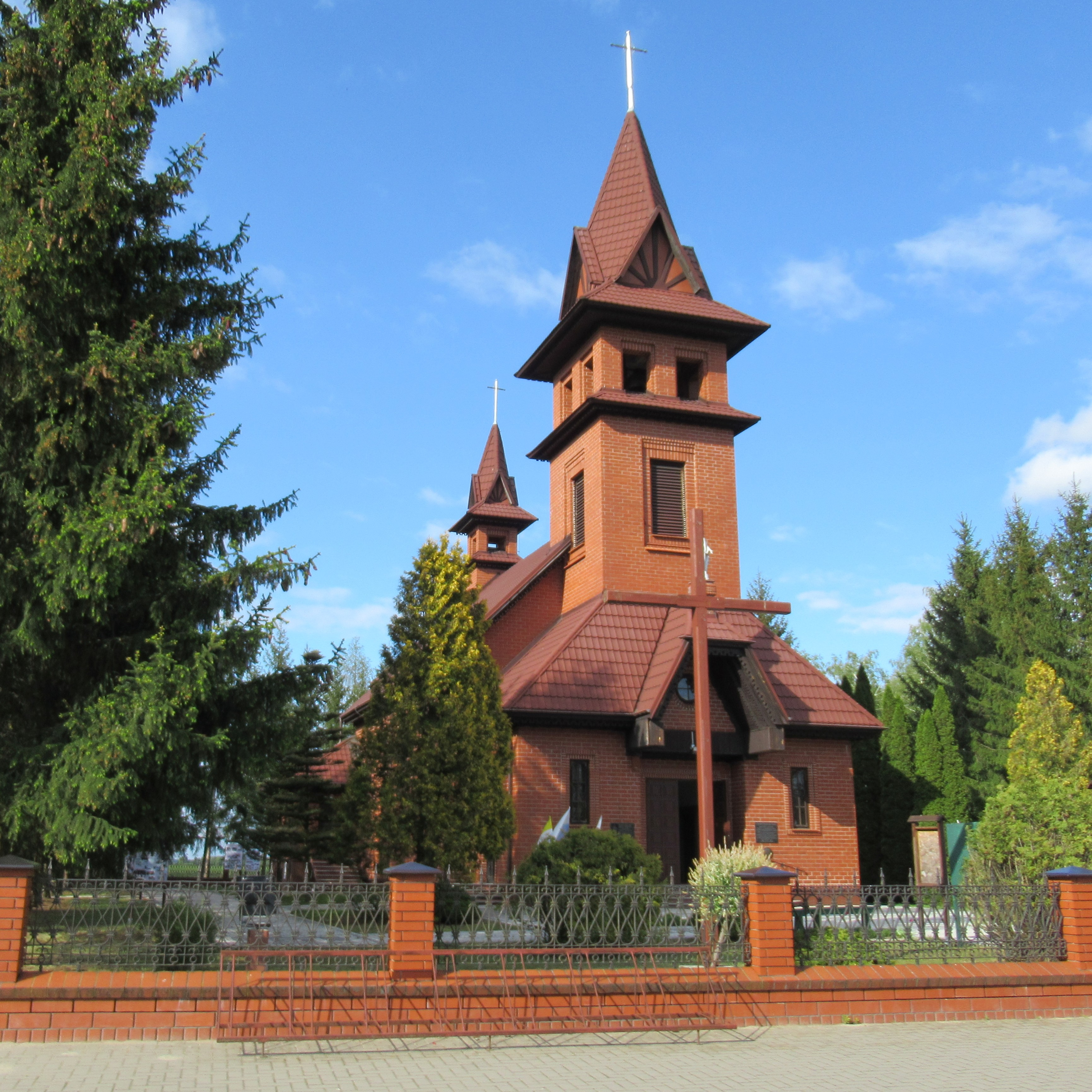
- The church of the Martyrdom of John the Baptist, Choroszczynka

- Location within Poland
- Coordinates: 51°55′N 23°27′E
- Country: Poland
- Voivodeship: Lublin
- County: Biała
- Gmina: Tuczna

Choroszczynka [xɔrɔʂˈt͡ʂɨŋka] is a village in the administrative district of Gmina Tuczna, within Biała County, Lublin Voivodeship, in eastern Poland.
