= Drozda =

Drozda is a surname. Notable people with the surname include:

- Joanna Drozda (born 1980), Polish actress
- Petr Drozda (born 1952), Czech wrestler
- Thomas Drozda (born 1965), Austrian politician

== See also ==
- Drozd (surname)
- Drozdowski
- Drozdov (surname)
