= The Manuscript Found in Saragossa =

Novel by Count Jan Potocki

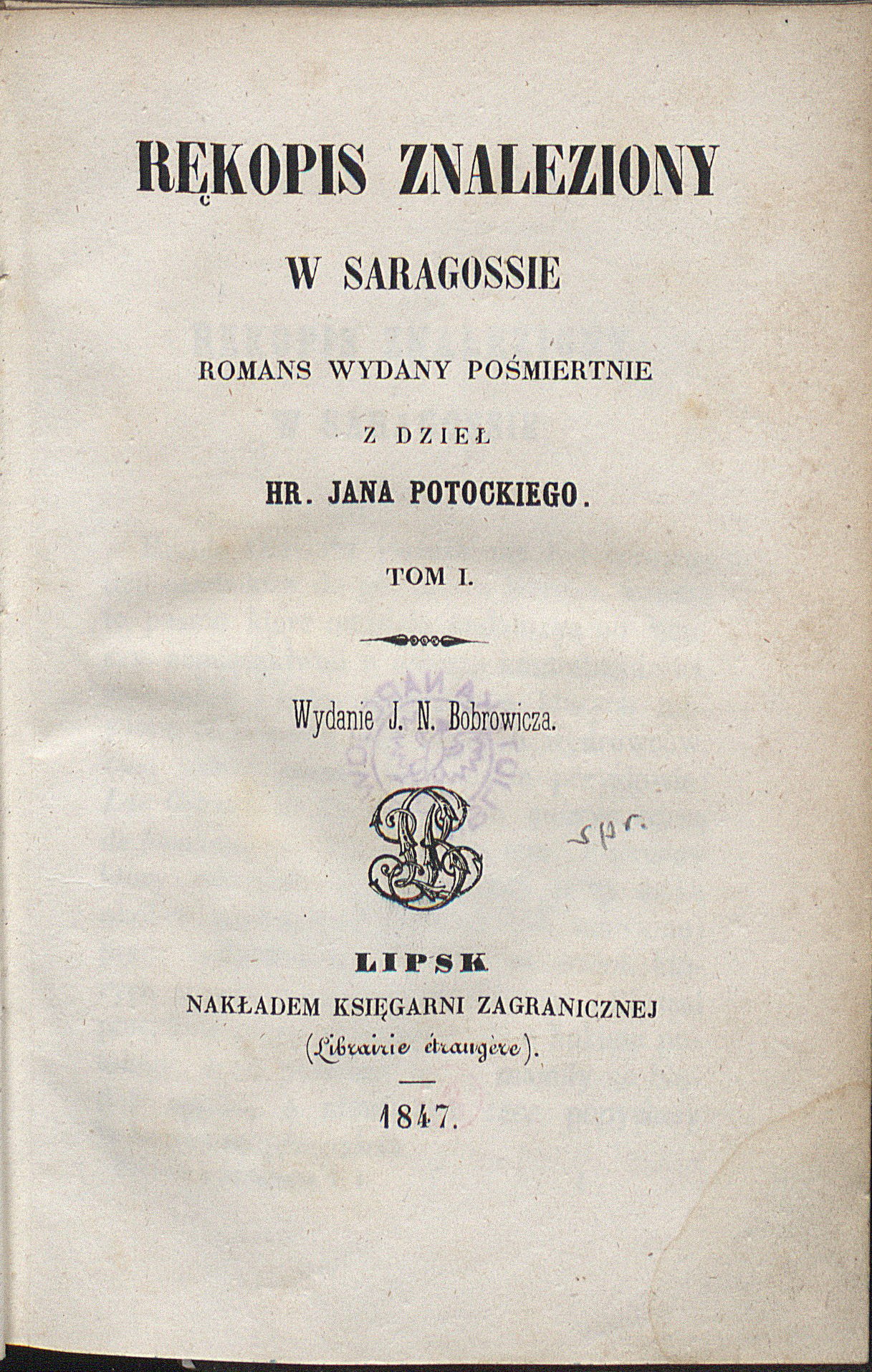
- Title page of Rękopis znaleziony w Saragossie (Polish translation), 1847
- Author: Jan Potocki
- Original title: Manuscrit trouvé à Saragosse
- Translator: Edmund Chojecki; Ian Maclean
- Language: French
- Genre: Picaresque novel; fantastique
- Publisher: Księgarnia Zagraniczna in Leipzig (first Polish edition)
- Publication date: 1805, 1813, 1847
- Media type: Print (Hardback and Paperback)

The Manuscript Found in Saragossa (French: Manuscrit trouvé à Saragosse; also known in English as The Saragossa Manuscript) is a frame-tale novel written in French at the turn of 18th and 19th centuries by the Polish author Count Jan Potocki (1761–1815). It is narrated from the time of the Napoleonic Wars, and depicts events several decades earlier, during the reign of King Philip V (r. 1700–46).

The novel was adapted into a 1965 Polish-language film, The Saragossa Manuscript (Polish: Rękopis znaleziony w Saragossie), by director Wojciech Has, with Zbigniew Cybulski as Alphonse van Worden.

From May 2024, a manuscript covering Days 41–51 of the novel is presented at a permanent exhibition in the Palace of the Commonwealth in Warsaw.

== Plot summary ==
The Manuscript Found in Saragossa collects intertwining stories, all of them set in whole or in part in Spain, with a large and colorful cast of Romani, thieves, inquisitors, a cabbalist, a geometer, the cabbalist's beautiful sister, two Moorish princesses (Emina and Zubeida) and others that the brave, perhaps foolhardy, Walloon Guard Alphonse van Worden meets, imagines or reads about in the Sierra Morena mountains of 18th-century Spain while en route to Madrid. Recounted to the narrator over the course of sixty-six days, the novel's stories quickly overshadow van Worden's frame story. The bulk of the stories revolve around the Romani chief Avadoro, whose story becomes a frame story itself. Eventually the narrative focus moves again toward van Worden's frame story and a conspiracy involving an underground Muslim society, revealing the connections and correspondences between the hundred or so stories told over the novel's sixty-six days.

== Analysis ==
The stories cover a wide range of genres and subjects, including the gothic, the picaresque, the erotic, the historical, the moral and the philosophic; and as a whole, the novel reflects Potocki's far-ranging interests, especially his deep fascination with secret societies, the supernatural and "Oriental" cultures. The novel's stories-within-stories sometimes reach several levels of depth, and characters and themes — a few prominent themes being honor, disguise, metamorphosis and conspiracy — recur and change shape throughout. Because of its rich and varied interlocking structure, the novel has been favorably compared to many celebrated literary antecedents such as the ancient BCE Jātakas and Panchatantra as well as the medieval Arabian Nights and Decameron.

== Textual history ==
The first "days" of The Manuscript Found in Saragossa were initially published apart from the rest of the novel in 1805, while the stories comprising the Gypsy chief's tale were added later. The novel was written incrementally and was left in its final form—though never exactly completed—at the time of the author's suicide in 1815.

Potocki composed the book entirely in French. Sections of the original French-language manuscripts were later lost, but have been back-translated into French from a Polish translation that had been made in 1847 by Edmund Chojecki from a complete French-language copy, now lost.

The first integral French-language version of the work, based on several French-language manuscripts and on Chojecki's 1847 Polish translation, was edited by René Radrizzani and published in 1989 by the renowned French publishing house of José Corti. Translations of the novel from the French rely, for the missing sections, on Chojecki's Polish translation. The most recent English-language edition, translated by Ian Maclean and published by Penguin Books in 1995, is derived from the Corti text.

In 1960, The Orion Press published an abridged translation by Elisabeth Abbott titled Saragossa Manuscript: A Collection of Weird Tales. In 1990, Dedalus Books published Tales from the Saragossa Manuscript: Ten Days in the Life of Alphonse Van Worden, an abridgement translated by Christine Donougher.

The most recent and complete French-language version to date was edited by François Rosset and Dominique Triaire and published in 2006 in Leuven, Belgium, as part of a critical scholarly edition of the Complete Works of Potocki. Unlike Radrizzani's 1989 edition of the Manuscript Found in Saragossa, Rosset and Triaire's edition is based solely on Potocki's French-language manuscripts found in libraries in France, Poland (in particular, previously unknown autograph pieces that they discovered in Poznań), Spain and Russia, as well as in the private collection of Potocki's heirs.

Rosset and Triaire identified two versions of the novel: one unfinished, of 1804, published in 1805; and the full version of 1810, which appears to have been completely reconceived in comparison to the 1804 version. Whereas the first version has a lighter, more sceptical tone, the second one tends toward a darker, more religious mood. In view of the differences between the two versions, the 1804 and 1810 versions have been published as two separate books; paperback editions were issued in early 2008 by Flammarion.

== Film, television and theatre ==
In 1965, director Wojciech Has adapted the novel into a Polish-language black-and-white film The Saragossa Manuscript (Polish title: Rękopis znaleziony w Saragossie), starring Zbigniew Cybulski. The film was released in a full-length Polish version (180 minutes) and in shortened versions in other countries (152 minutes in the United States, and 125 in the United Kingdom).

The film was admired by many 1960s counterculture artists, notably Grateful Dead guitarist Jerry Garcia, who financed a complete print, as well as mainstream figures such as Martin Scorsese, Francis Ford Coppola, and Luis Buñuel. Neil Gaiman has referenced the book and film, in passing, in at least three different works. The film was shot near Częstochowa and in Wrocław, Poland. A detailed outline of the movie's plot is available online.

In 1973, the novel was adapted into a television mini-series in France, under the title "La Duchesse d'Avila", with Jean Blaise as Van Worden.

The late Vi Marriott adapted the book for The Cherub Theatre Company, which was performed by them under the title 'Ten Days A-Maze' and won several awards at the 1997 Edinburgh Fringe.*

In 1984, the Mexican writer Juan Tovar made the first theatrical adaptation of the novel in Spanish, which was edited by the theater and film director Ludwik Margules.

A later adaption is the Romanian-language play Saragosa, 66 de Zile (Saragossa, 66 Days), written and directed by Alexandru Dabija in 1999 at the Odeon Theatre Bucharest, and first represented at The Theater der Welt festival in Berlin.

Christine Mary Dunford adapted an English-language stage version from Ian Maclean's translation of the novel.

Subsequently, the novel (and film) acted themselves as a frame-story for an episode of the Italian TV series Inspector Montalbano.

In 2001, composer José Evangelista premiered the opera "Manuscrit trouvé à Saragosse" on a libretto by Alexis Nouss based on the novel.

In 2017, the Italian filmmaker Alberto Rondalli adapted the book in a movie titled Agadah.

== Characters ==
- Alphonse van Worden, the narrator
- The Sheikh Gomelez, mysterious focus of conspiracy
- Emina and Zubeida, Tunisian sisters
- The Hermit
- Pacheco, possessed servant of the hermit
- Rabbi Zadok ben Mamoun aka Don Pedro de Uzeda, a cabbalist
- Doña Rebecca Uzeda, the cabbalist's sister
- Ahasuerus, the Wandering Jew
- Don Pedro Velásquez, a geometer
- Señor Avadoro aka Pandesowna, a gypsy chief
- Don Toledo, an amorous knight
- Busqueros, a nuisance
- Zoto's brothers, a pair of bandits hanging from the gallows. Zoto himself is hiding somewhere in the nearby mountains.

== See also ==
- Back-translation of The Saragossa Manuscript
- Polish literature
