= Gusin, Łódź Voivodeship =

Gusin
- Village
- Location within Poland
- Coordinates: 52°2′43″N 18°57′34″E
- Country: Poland
- Voivodeship: Łódź
- County: Łęczyca
- Gmina: Świnice Warckie

Gusin [ˈɡuɕin] is a village in the administrative district of Gmina Świnice Warckie, within Łęczyca County, Łódź Voivodeship, in central Poland.
