= Polusin =

- Village
- Location within Poland
- Coordinates: 52°3′36″N 18°53′54″E
- Country: Poland
- Voivodeship: Łódź
- County: Łęczyca
- Gmina: Świnice Warckie
- Population: 40

Polusin [pɔˈluɕin] is a village in the administrative district of Gmina Świnice Warckie, within Łęczyca County, Łódź Voivodeship, in central Poland.
