= Matiaszówka =

- Village
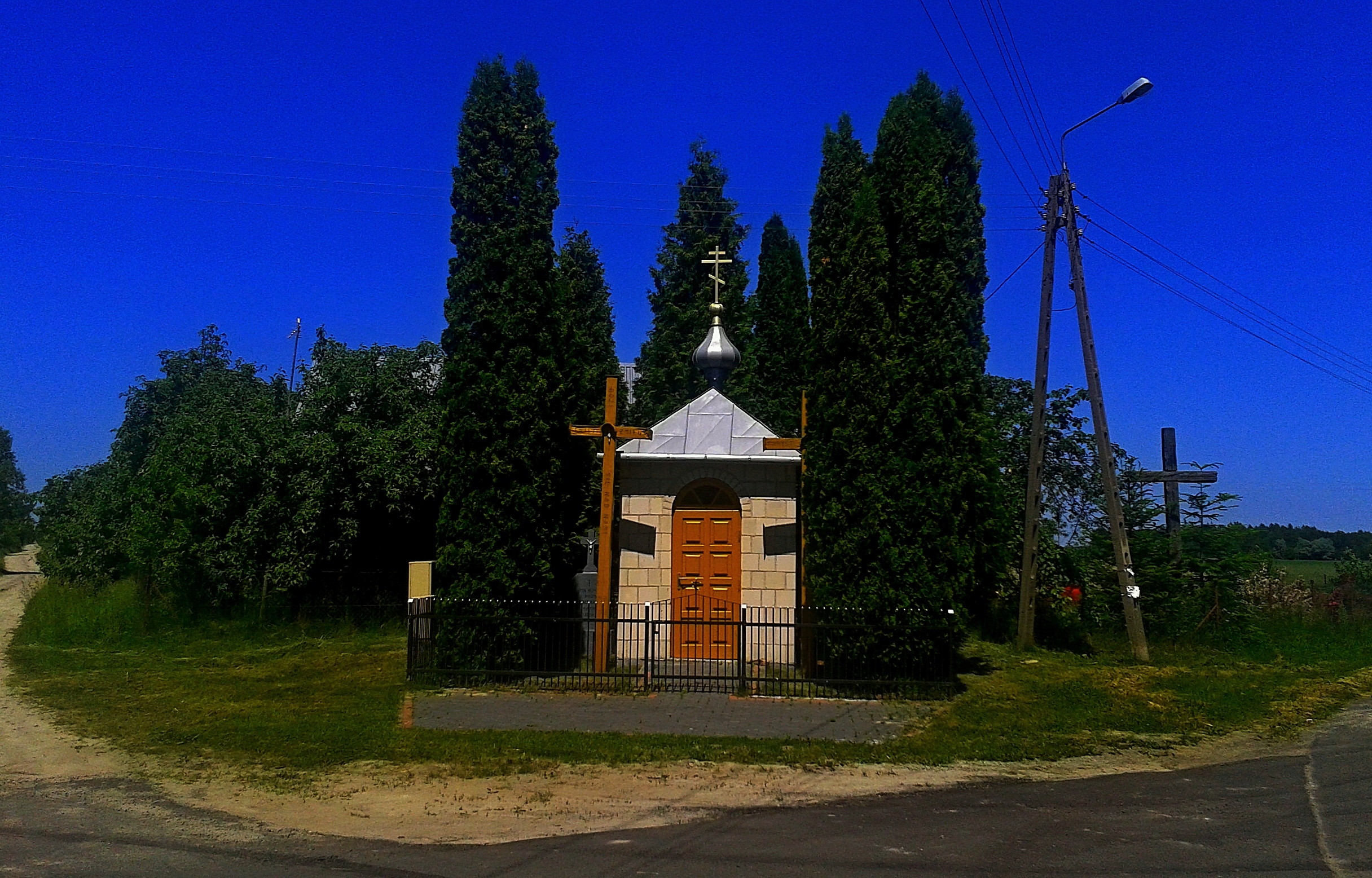
- An orthodox chapel in Matiaszówka

- Location within Poland
- Coordinates: 51°49′N 23°28′E
- Country: Poland
- Voivodeship: Lublin
- County: Biała
- Gmina: Tuczna
- Time zone: UTC+1 (CET)
  - Summer (DST): UTC+2 (CEST)

Matiaszówka [matjaˈʂufka] is a village in the administrative district of Gmina Tuczna, within Biała County, Lublin Voivodeship, in eastern Poland.

== History ==
Four Polish citizens were murdered by Nazi Germany in the village during World War II.
