= Rozbitówka =

- Village
- Location within Poland
- Coordinates: 51°50′N 23°30′E
- Country: Poland
- Voivodeship: Lublin
- County: Biała
- Gmina: Tuczna

Rozbitówka [rɔzbʲiˈtufka] is a village in the administrative district of Gmina Tuczna, within Biała County, Lublin Voivodeship, in eastern Poland.
