= Świnice Warckie-Kolonia =

- Village
- Location within Poland
- Coordinates: 52°02′43″N 18°56′08″E
- Country: Poland
- Voivodeship: Łódź
- County: Łęczyca
- Gmina: Świnice Warckie

Świnice Warckie-Kolonia [ɕfiˈnit͡sɛ ˈvart͡skʲɛ kɔˈlɔɲa] is a village in the administrative district of Gmina Świnice Warckie, within Łęczyca County, Łódź Voivodeship, in central Poland.
