= Bokinka Królewska =

- Village
- Location within Poland
- Coordinates: 51°54′N 23°22′E
- Country: Poland
- Voivodeship: Lublin
- County: Biała
- Gmina: Tuczna

Bokinka Królewska [bɔˈkʲiŋka kruˈlɛfska] is a village in the administrative district of Gmina Tuczna, within Biała County, Lublin Voivodeship, in eastern Poland.
