= Gmina Świnice Warckie =

Gmina Świnice Warckie Świnice Warckie Commune
- Gmina
- Flag Coat of arms
- Interactive map of Gmina Świnice Warckie
- Coordinates (Świnice Warckie): 52°2′N 18°55′E
- Country: Poland
- Voivodeship: Łódź
- County: Łęczyca
- Seat: Świnice Warckie

Area
  - Total: 93.95 km^{2} (36.27 sq mi)

Population (2006)
  - Total: 4,114
  - Density: 43.79/km^{2} (113.4/sq mi)

Gmina Świnice Warckie is a rural gmina (administrative district) in Łęczyca County, Łódź Voivodeship, in central Poland. Its seat is the village of Świnice Warckie, which lies approximately 20 kilometres (12 mi) west of Łęczyca and 47 km (29 mi) north-west of the regional capital Łódź.

The gmina covers an area of 93.95 square kilometres (36.3 sq mi), and as of 2006 its total population is 4,114.

== Villages ==
Gmina Świnice Warckie contains the villages and settlements of Bielawy, Chęcin, Chorzepin, Chorzepinek, Chwalborzyce, Drozdów, Głogowiec, Grodzisko, Gusin, Hektary, Holendry, Kaznów, Kaznówek, Kosew, Kozanki Podleśne, Kraski, Ładawy, Łyków, Parski, Piaski, Podgórze, Podłęże, Polusin, Rogów, Rydzyna, Stawiszynek, Stemplew, Strachów, Świnice Warckie, Świnice Warckie-Kolonia, Tolów, Władysławów, Wola Świniecka, Wyganów, Zbylczyce and Zimne.

== Neighbouring gminas ==
Gmina Świnice Warckie is bordered by the gminas of Dąbie, Grabów, Łęczyca, Uniejów and Wartkowice.
