= Rogów, Łęczyca County =

Rogów
- Village
- Location within Poland
- Coordinates: 52°1′43″N 18°58′9″E
- Country: Poland
- Voivodeship: Łódź
- County: Łęczyca
- Gmina: Świnice Warckie

Rogów [ˈrɔɡuf] is a village in the administrative district of Gmina Świnice Warckie, within Łęczyca County, Łódź Voivodeship, in central Poland.
