= Maria Yudina =

Soviet pianist (1899–1970)

Maria Yudina Мария Юдина
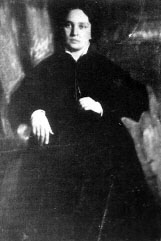
- Yudina in 1922

Background information
- Born: Mariya Veniaminovna Yudina; 9 September [O.S. 28 August], 1899; Nevel, Vitebsk Governorate, Russian Empire
- Died: 19 November 1970 (aged 71) Moscow, Soviet Union
- Instrument: Piano

Maria Veniaminovna Yudina (Russian: Мария Вениаминовна Юдина; 9 September [O.S. 28 August] 1899 – 19 November 1970) was a Soviet pianist.

== Early life and education ==
Maria Yudina was born to a Jewish family in Nevel, Vitebsk Governorate, Russian Empire. She was the fourth child of Veniamin Yudin, a renowned physiologist and forensic expert, and his first wife, Raisa Yakovlevna Yudina (née Zlatina; 1868–1918). Yudina studied at the Petrograd Conservatory under Anna Yesipova, Leonid Nikolayev, and Vladimir Drozdov. She also briefly studied privately with Felix Blumenfeld. Her classmates included Dmitri Shostakovich and Vladimir Sofronitsky. In 1921–22 Yudina attended lectures at the historical-philological department of Petrograd University and, as a result, completed studies in theology after she had already converted from Judaism to the Orthodox Christian faith in 1919.

== Career ==
After her graduation from the Petrograd Conservatory, Yudina was invited to teach there, which she did until 1930, when she was dismissed from the institution because her religious convictions were unwelcome in an atheist state. After being unemployed and homeless for several years, Yudina was invited to teach the graduate piano course at the Tbilisi State Conservatory in 1932–33. In 1936, on Heinrich Neuhaus's suggestion, Yudina joined the piano faculty of the Moscow Conservatory, where she taught until 1951. From 1944 to 1960 Yudina taught chamber ensemble and vocal class at the Gnessin Institute (now Gnessin Russian Academy of Music). In 1960 Yudina was fired from the Gnessin Institute because of her religious attitudes and advocacy of modern Western music. She continued to perform in public, but her recitals were forbidden to be recorded. After an incident during one of her recitals in Leningrad, when she read Boris Pasternak's poetry from the stage as an encore, Yudina was banned from performing for five years. In 1966, when the ban was lifted, she gave a cycle of lectures on Romanticism at the Moscow Conservatory.

According to an otherwise unsubstantiated story in Solomon Volkov's book Testimony, which claims to represent Shostakovich's memoirs, one night in 1944 Stalin heard a performance of Mozart's Piano Concerto No. 23 on the radio performed by Yudina, and asked for a copy. Because it was a live broadcast, officials woke Yudina, drove her to a recording studio where a small orchestra had quickly been assembled, and made her record the concerto in the middle of the night; a single copy was pressed from the matrix and given to Stalin. In another apocryphal story, she was awarded the Stalin Prize and donated its monetary portion to the Russian Orthodox Church for prayers for Stalin's sins. These stories were extensively researched by Elizabeth Wilson, who found no evidence either in Yudina's recorded oeuvre or in Stalin's well-preserved archives, and concluded they were unlikely to be true and attributed them to Shostakovich's predilection for imaginative tales. Furthermore, the existing recording of the Mozart concerto with Alexander Gauk dates from 1948, so the date 1943/1944 could be wrong.

While Yudina did not overtly criticise any political figures or the Soviet system as a whole, she remained true to her religious convictions. She died in Moscow in 1970.

Yudina's playing was marked by great virtuosity, spirituality, strength and intellectual rigor, with a highly idiosyncratic style and tone. Sviatoslav Richter said of her playing:

She was immensely talented and a keen advocate of the music of her own time: she played Stravinsky, whom she adored, Hindemith, Krenek and Bartók at a time when these composers were not only unknown in the Soviet Union but effectively banned. And when she played Romantic music, it was impressive—except that she didn't play what was written. Liszt's Weinen und Klagen was phenomenal, but Schubert's B-flat major Sonata, while arresting as an interpretation, was the exact opposite of what it should have been, and I remember a performance of the Second Chopin Nocturne that was so heroic that it no longer sounded like a piano but a trumpet. It was no longer Schubert or Chopin, but Yudina.

Among her friends were Shostakovich, Pasternak (who did the first reading of his novel Doctor Zhivago at Yudina's apartment as early as February 1947), Osip Mandelstam, Mikhail Bakhtin, Pierre Suvchinsky, Pierre Boulez and Karlheinz Stockhausen.

Thanks to the efforts of Yudina's friends in Russia, particularly Anatoly Kuznetsov, Yudina's letters and writings were published in the late 1990s and early 2000s. There were several attempts to complete the set of Yudina's recordings.

== In fiction ==
Yudina was portrayed as a character in Aleksei Losev's novel Woman as Thinker. The flawed heroine Losev created was a woman musician who spouted philosophy but held herself to lower standards. The novel has been criticized as an outlet for Losev's difficult relationship with Yudina, and as a poor example of his capabilities as a writer. She was offended by the book and ended their friendship in 1934.

In 1989 David Zane Mairowitz wrote The Stalin Sonata, a radio drama loosely based on an encounter between Stalin and Yudina. It won a Giles Cooper Award.

Yudina appears in the French graphic novel La mort de Staline, which retells the concerto story from Solomon Volkov's book Testimony and fictitiously portrays her writing a castigating letter to Stalin that prompts his death. In the novel's 2017 Anglo-French film adaptation The Death of Stalin, she is portrayed by Olga Kurylenko.
