= Kaznówek =

- Village
- Location within Poland
- Coordinates: 52°4′6″N 18°53′40″E
- Country: Poland
- Voivodeship: Łódź
- County: Łęczyca
- Gmina: Świnice Warckie

Kaznówek [kazˈnuvɛk] is a village in the administrative district of Gmina Świnice Warckie, within Łęczyca County, Łódź Voivodeship, in central Poland.
