= Żuki, Gmina Tuczna =

Żuki
- Village
- Location within Poland
- Coordinates: 51°48′36″N 23°24′42″E
- Country: Poland
- Voivodeship: Lublin
- County: Biała
- Gmina: Tuczna

Żuki [ˈʐukʲi] is a village in the administrative district of Gmina Tuczna, within Biała County, Lublin Voivodeship, in eastern Poland.
