= Zimne =

- Village
- Location within Poland
- Coordinates: 52°3′47″N 19°1′30″E
- Country: Poland
- Voivodeship: Łódź
- County: Łęczyca
- Gmina: Świnice Warckie

Zimne [ˈʑimnɛ] is a village in the administrative district of Gmina Świnice Warckie, within Łęczyca County, Łódź Voivodeship, in central Poland.
