= Tuczna =

- Village
- Location within Poland
- Coordinates: 51°53′N 23°26′E
- Country: Poland
- Voivodeship: Lublin
- County: Biała
- Gmina: Tuczna

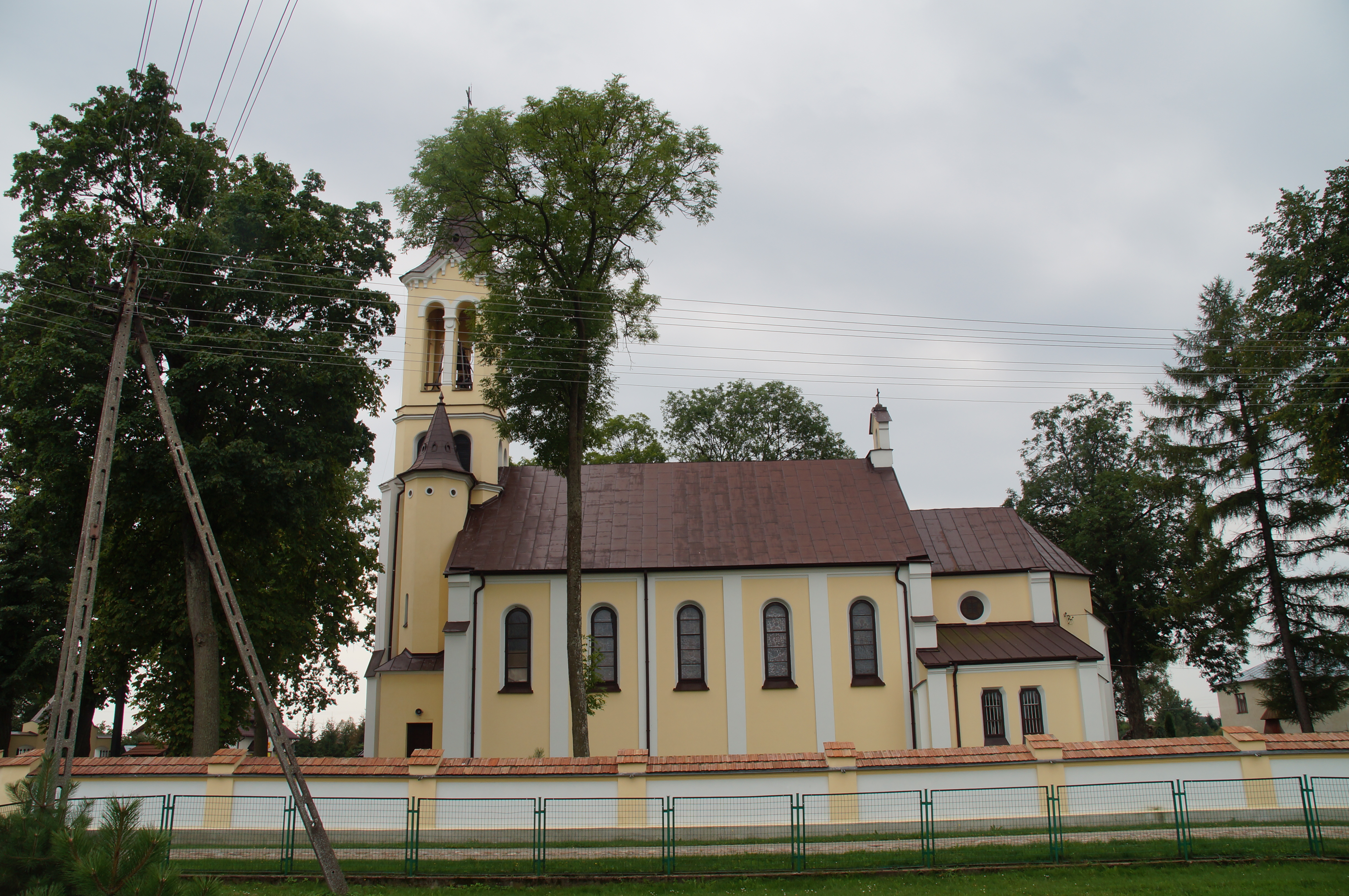
Church of St. Anna in Tuczna

Tuczna [ˈtut͡ʂna] is a village in Biała County, Lublin Voivodeship, in eastern Poland. It is the seat of the gmina (administrative district) called Gmina Tuczna.
