= Rydzyna, Łódź Voivodeship =

Rydzyna
- Village
- Location within Poland
- Coordinates: 52°04′04″N 19°01′30″E
- Country: Poland
- Voivodeship: Łódź
- County: Łęczyca
- Gmina: Świnice Warckie

Rydzyna [rɨˈd͡zɨna] is a village in the administrative district of Gmina Świnice Warckie, within Łęczyca County, Łódź Voivodeship, in central Poland.

Rydzyna lies on the left bank of the Ner river.
