= Drozdov (surname) =

Drozdov (Russian: Дроздов; feminine: Drozdova (Russian: Дроздовa)) is a Russian surname. It is derived from the sobriquet дрозд (drozd, meaning 'thrush', 'blackbird'). Notable people with the surname include:

- Alexander Drozdov (born 1970), Russian politician
- Aleksey Drozdov (born 1983), Russian decathlete
- Darren Drozdov (1969–2023), American essayist and professional wrestler
- Nikolai Drozdov (born 1937), Russian broadcaster and naturalist
- Philaret Drozdov (1782–1867), Metropolitan of Moscow and Kolomna
- Serhii Drozdov (born 1962), Ukrainian military leader and sniper pilot
- Vladimir Drozdov (1882–1960), Russian-American pianist and composer
- Yuri Drozdov (footballer) (born 1972), Russian football player and coach
- Yuri Drozdov (general) (1925–2017), Russian security official

== See also ==
- Drozd (surname)
- Drozda surname
- Drozdowski
