= Wola Świniecka =

- Village
- Location within Poland
- Coordinates: 52°1′N 18°57′E
- Country: Poland
- Voivodeship: Łódź
- County: Łęczyca
- Gmina: Świnice Warckie

Wola Świniecka [ˈvɔla ɕfiˈɲɛt͡ska] is a village in the administrative district of Gmina Świnice Warckie, within Łęczyca County, Łódź Voivodeship, in central Poland.
