= Bokinka Pańska =

- Village
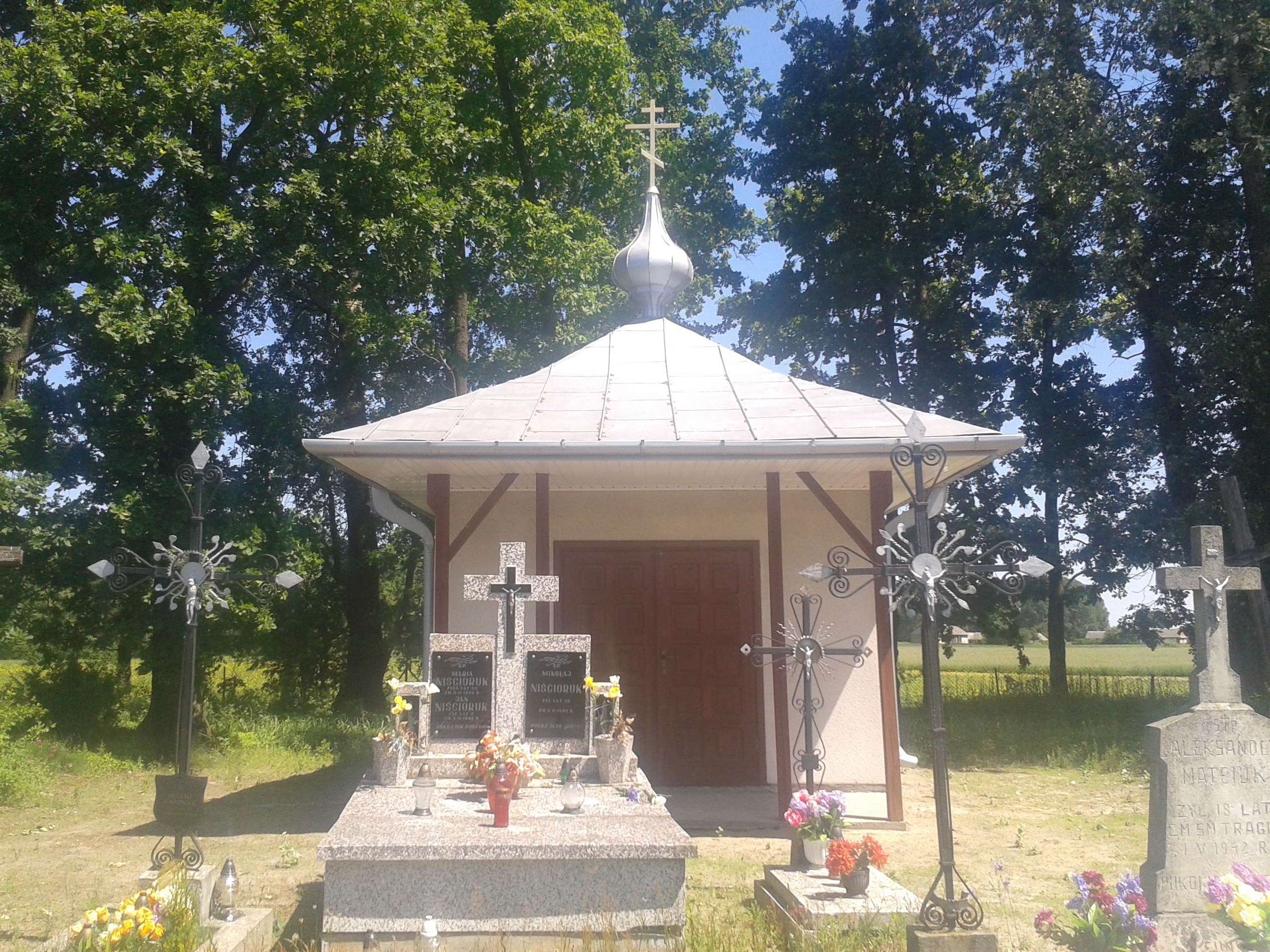
- Cemetery in Bokinka Pańska with the church of St. Nicholas

- Location within Poland
- Coordinates: 51°50′N 23°20′E
- Country: Poland
- Voivodeship: Lublin
- County: Biała
- Gmina: Tuczna

Bokinka Pańska (Polish pronunciation: [bɔˈkʲiŋka ˈpaj̃ska]) is a village in the administrative district of Gmina Tuczna, within Biała County, Lublin Voivodeship, in eastern Poland.
