= Hektary, Łódź Voivodeship =

Hektary
- Village
- Location within Poland
- Coordinates: 52°4′22″N 18°56′32″E
- Country: Poland
- Voivodeship: Łódź
- County: Łęczyca
- Gmina: Świnice Warckie

Hektary [xɛkˈtarɨ] is a village in the administrative district of Gmina Świnice Warckie, within Łęczyca County, Łódź Voivodeship, in central Poland.

Hektary lies on the left bank of the Ner river.
