= Parski, Łódź Voivodeship =

Parski
- Village
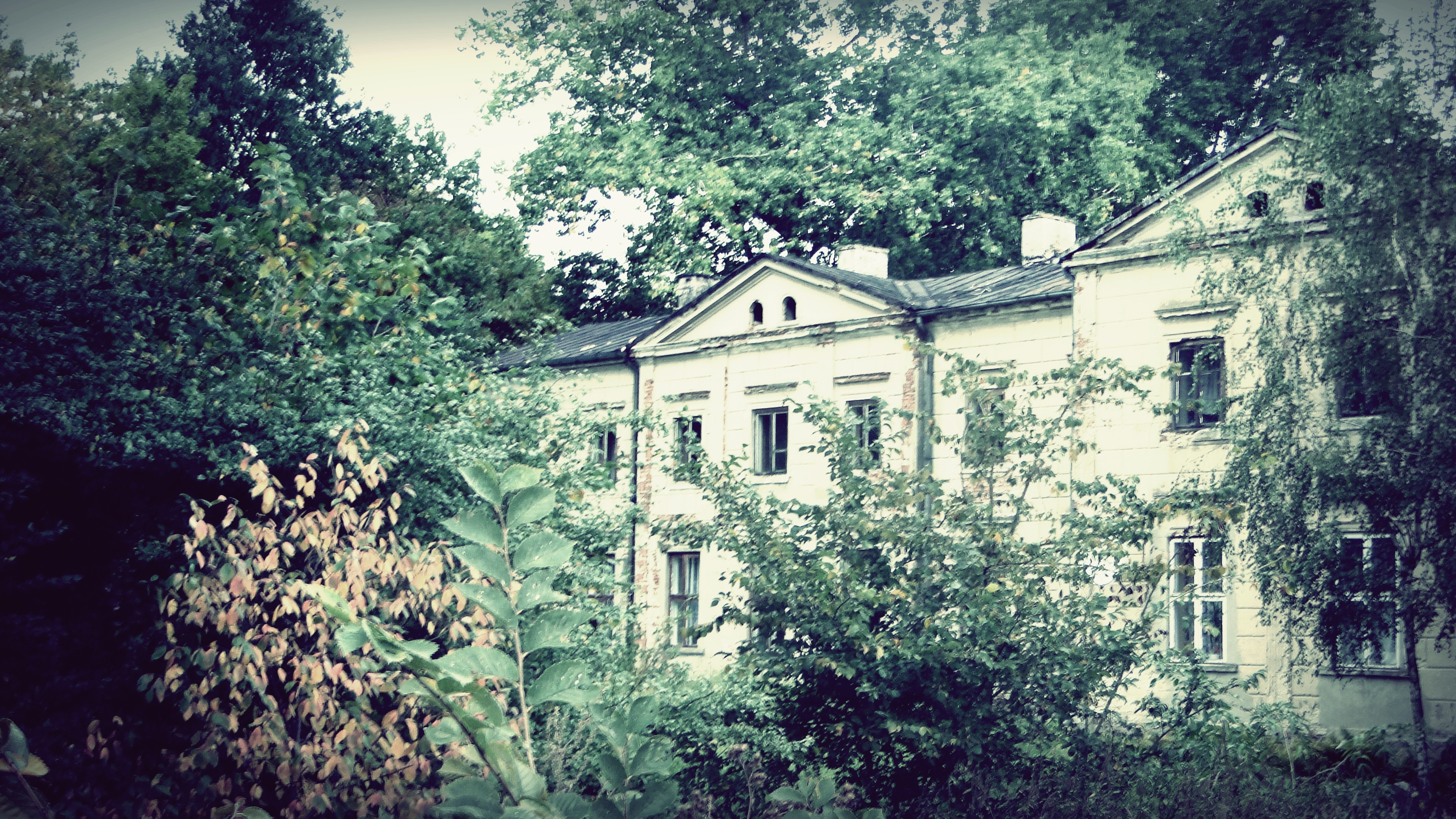
- A manor house complex with park in Parski

- Location within Poland
- Coordinates: 52°3′12″N 19°2′2″E
- Country: Poland
- Voivodeship: Łódź
- County: Łęczyca
- Gmina: Świnice Warckie

Parski [ˈparski] is a village in the administrative district of Gmina Świnice Warckie, within Łęczyca County, Łódź Voivodeship, in central Poland.
