= Ogrodniki, Gmina Tuczna =

Ogrodniki
- Village
- Location within Poland
- Coordinates: 51°50′55″N 23°25′48″E
- Country: Poland
- Voivodeship: Lublin
- County: Biała
- Gmina: Tuczna

Ogrodniki [ɔɡrɔdˈɲikʲi] is a village in the administrative district of Gmina Tuczna, within Biała County, Lublin Voivodeship, in eastern Poland.
