= Kosew =

- Village
- Location within Poland
- Coordinates: 52°3′56″N 19°0′32″E
- Country: Poland
- Voivodeship: Łódź
- County: Łęczyca
- Gmina: Świnice Warckie

Kosew [ˈkɔsɛf] is a village in the administrative district of Gmina Świnice Warckie, within Łęczyca, Łódź Voivodeship, in central Poland.
