= Piaski, Gmina Świnice Warckie =

Piaski
- Village
- Location within Poland
- Coordinates: 52°2′32″N 18°58′40″E
- Country: Poland
- Voivodeship: Łódź
- County: Łęczyca
- Gmina: Świnice Warckie

Piaski (Polish pronunciation: [ˈpjaskʲi]) is a village in the administrative district of Gmina Świnice Warckie, within Łęczyca County, Łódź Voivodeship, in central Poland.
