= Zbylczyce =

- Village
- Location within Poland
- Coordinates: 52°3′N 18°54′E
- Country: Poland
- Voivodeship: Łódź
- County: Łęczyca
- Gmina: Świnice Warckie

Zbylczyce [zbɨlˈt͡ʂɨt͡sɛ] is a village in the administrative district of Gmina Świnice Warckie, within Łęczyca County, Łódź Voivodeship, in central Poland.
