= Grodzisko, Łęczyca County =

Grodzisko
- Village
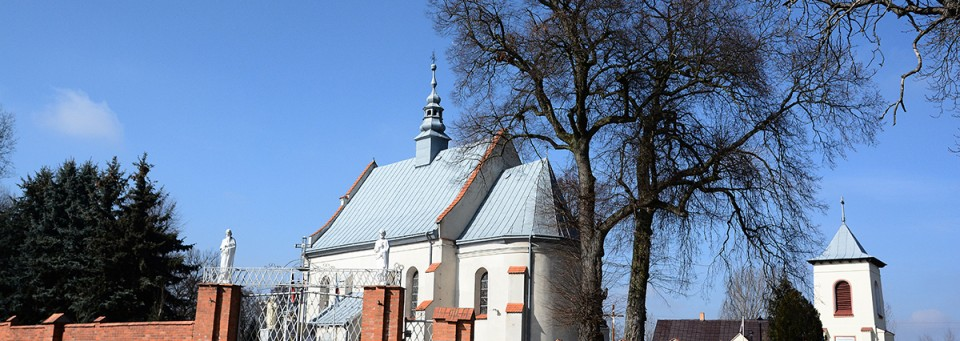
- Catholic church

- Location within Poland
- Coordinates: 52°3′49″N 18°57′56″E
- Country: Poland
- Voivodeship: Łódź
- County: Łęczyca
- Gmina: Świnice Warckie

Grodzisko [ɡrɔˈd͡ʑiskɔ] is a village in the administrative district of Gmina Świnice Warckie, within Łęczyca County, Łódź Voivodeship, in central Poland.
