= Wólka Zabłocka, Gmina Tuczna =

Wólka Zabłocka
- Village
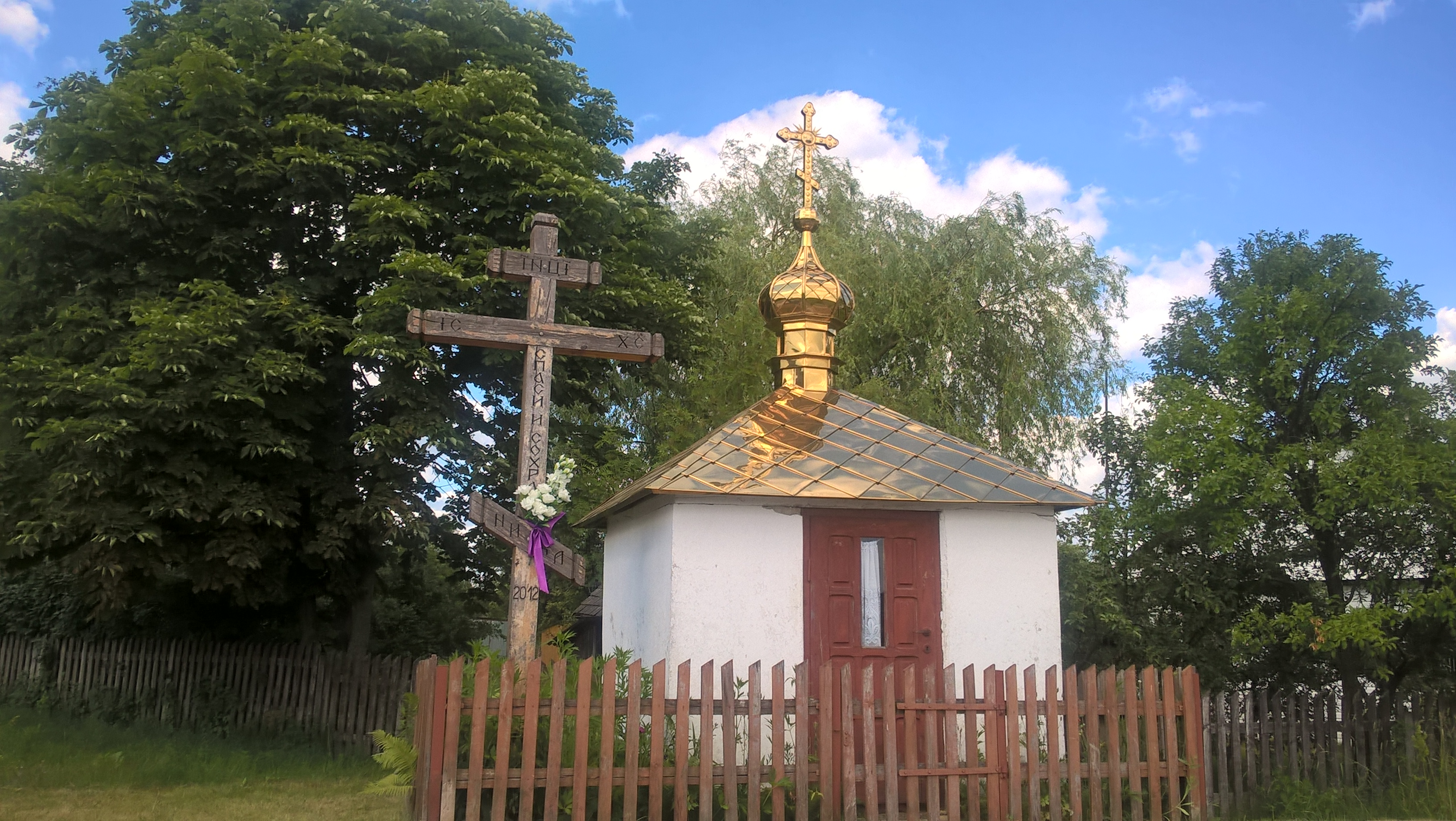
- An Orthodox Chapel in Wólka Zabłocka

- Location within Poland
- Coordinates: 51°51′N 23°32′E
- Country: Poland
- Voivodeship: Lublin
- County: Biała
- Gmina: Tuczna

Wólka Zabłocka [ˈvulka zaˈbwɔt͡ska] is a village in the administrative district of Gmina Tuczna, within Biała County, Lublin Voivodeship, in eastern Poland.
