= Wólka Zabłocka-Kolonia =

- Village
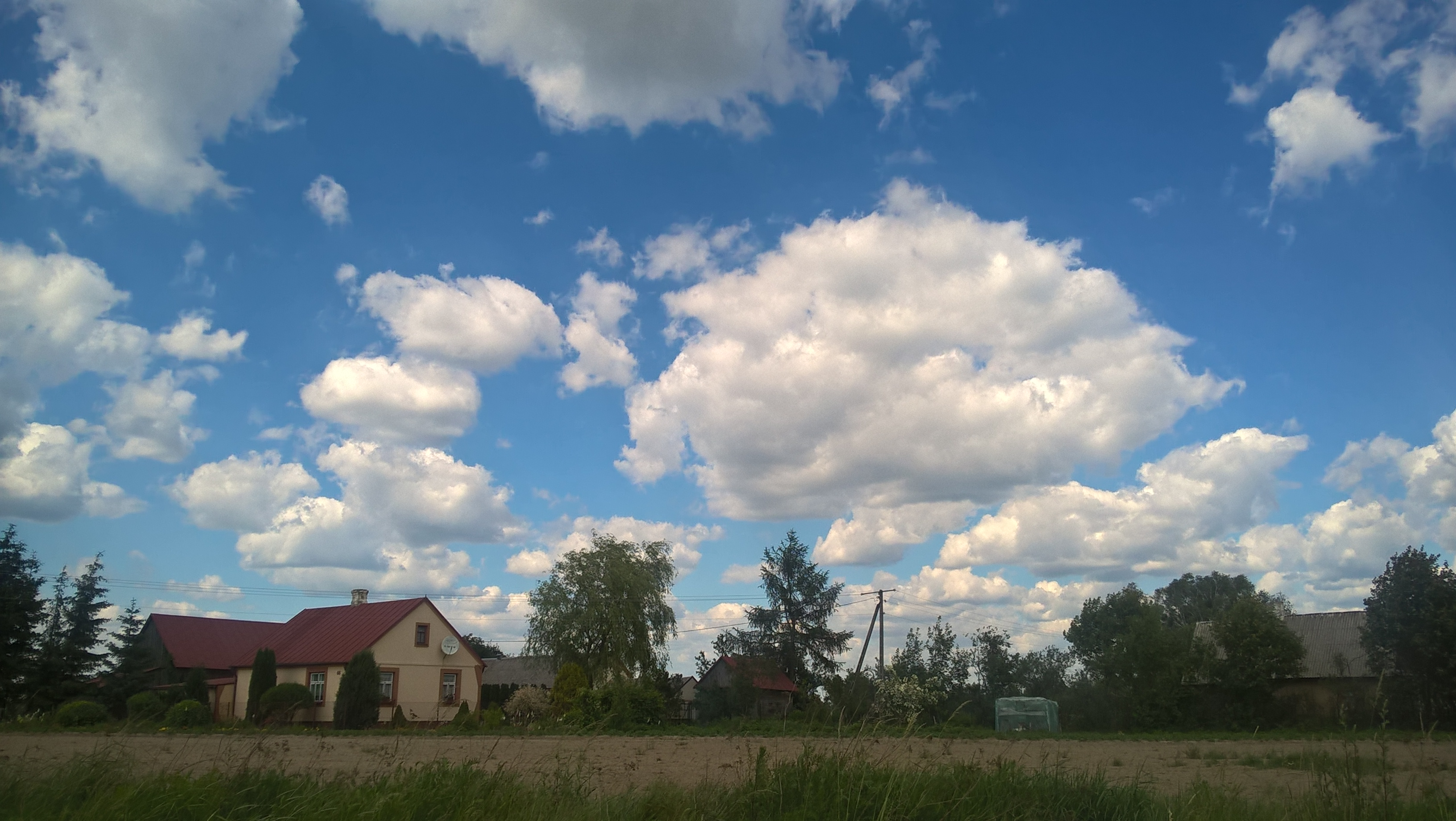

- Location within Poland
- Coordinates: 51°51′31″N 23°30′45″E
- Country: Poland
- Voivodeship: Lublin
- County: Biała
- Gmina: Tuczna

Wólka Zabłocka-Kolonia [ˈvulka zaˈbwɔt͡ska kɔˈlɔɲa] is a village in the administrative district of Gmina Tuczna, within Biała County, Lublin Voivodeship, in eastern Poland.
