= Podgórze, Łęczyca County =

Podgórze
- Village
- Location within Poland
- Coordinates: 52°3′47″N 18°56′51″E
- Country: Poland
- Voivodeship: Łódź
- County: Łęczyca
- Gmina: Świnice Warckie

Podgórze [pɔdˈɡuʐɛ] is a village in the administrative district of Gmina Świnice Warckie, within Łęczyca County, Łódź Voivodeship, in central Poland.
