= Dąbrowica Duża =

- Village
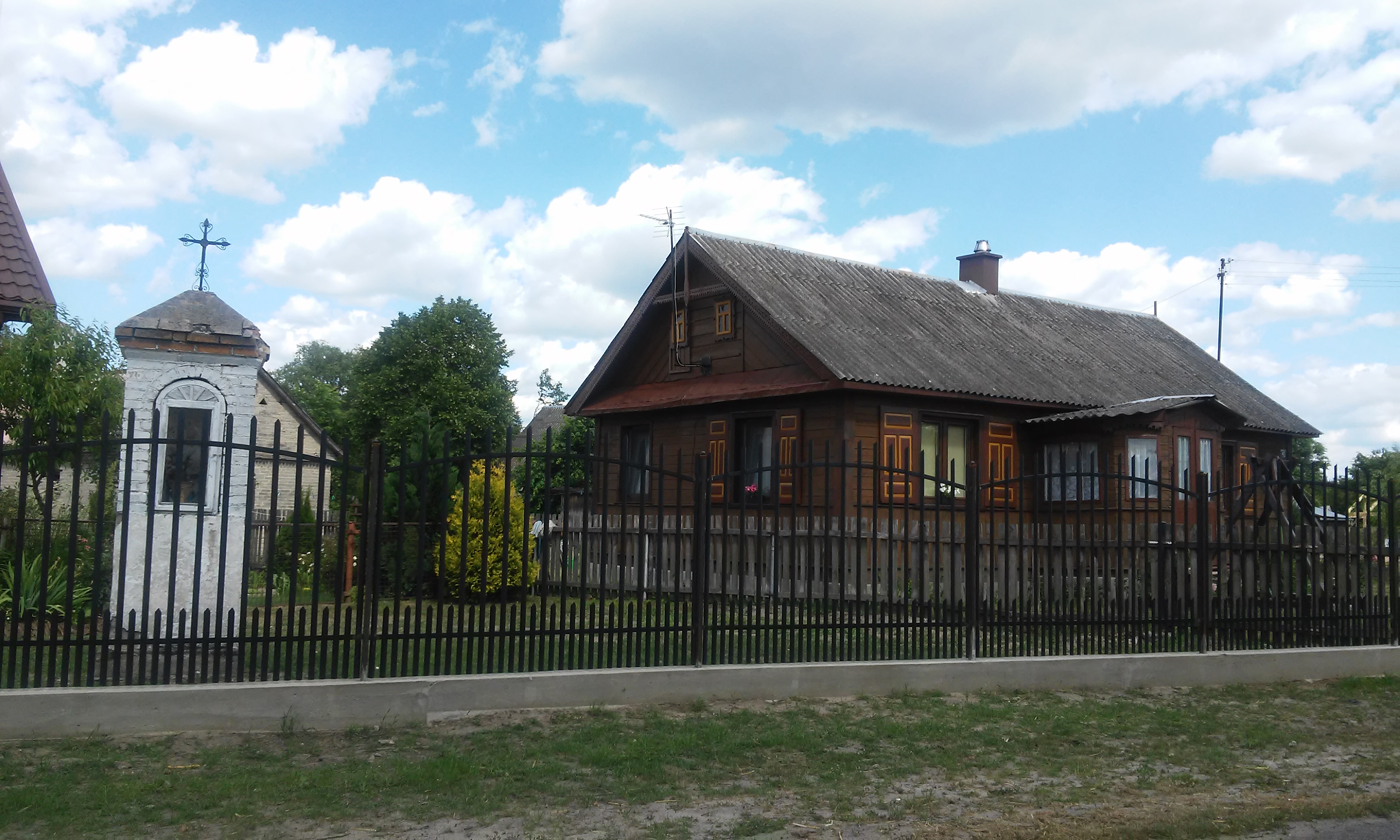
- House in Dąbrowica Duża with a chapel

- Location within Poland
- Coordinates: 51°55′N 23°24′E
- Country: Poland
- Voivodeship: Lublin
- County: Biała
- Gmina: Tuczna

Dąbrowica Duża [dɔmbrɔˈvʲit͡sa ˈduʐa] is a village in the administrative district of Gmina Tuczna, within Biała County, Lublin Voivodeship, in eastern Poland.
