= Leniuszki =

- Village
- Location within Poland
- Coordinates: 51°52′N 23°31′E
- Country: Poland
- Voivodeship: Lublin
- County: Biała
- Gmina: Tuczna

Leniuszki [lɛˈɲuʂkʲi] is a village in the administrative district of Gmina Tuczna, within Biała County, Lublin Voivodeship, in eastern Poland.
