= Emanuel Bay =

Russian-American classical pianist (1891–1967)

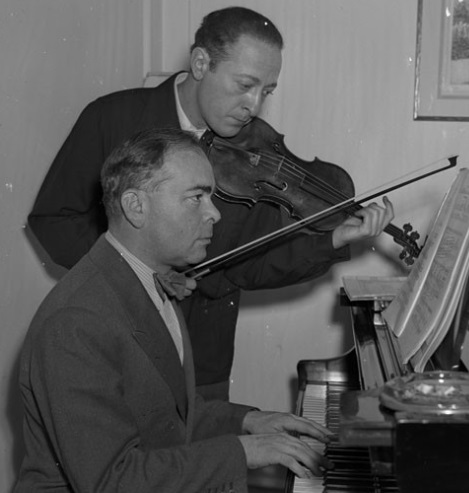
- Emanuel Bay with Jascha Heifetz in 1938
- Born: January 20, 1891; Simferopol, Taurida Governorate, Russian Empire
- Died: December 2, 1967 (aged 76); Jerusalem, Israel
- Education: Saint Petersburg Conservatory
- Occupations: Pianist, music professor

Emanuel Bay (January 20, 1891 [O.S. January 8] – December 2, 1967) was a Russian‑American pianist. He was a personal friend and accompanist to violinist Jascha Heifetz for more than 20 years, touring widely across the United States and Europe.

== Early life ==
Bay was born in Simferopol, Russian Empire, on the Crimean Peninsula to a Russian‑Jewish family in 1891. His younger brother Victor Bay was born in 1896 and became a violinist and conductor. Emanuel studied at the Saint Petersburg Conservatory with Vladimir Drozdov, winning first prize in piano in 1913. He later continued his studies at the Imperial Master School in Vienna, where he took a master class with Leopold Godowsky.

== Career ==
Bay became a professor of piano at the Moscow Conservatory and later at the Odesa Conservatory. While in Russia, he met violinist Efrem Zimbalist, who invited him to tour the United States together. Between 1914 and 1922, Bay performed widely across Europe and the U.S. with Zimbalist. Their last performance together was in winter of 1930.

During World War II, Bay was unable to perform in the United States, performing throughout the Soviet Union and Yugoslavia instead.

After the war, Bay immigrated to the United States. He had known violinist Jascha Heifetz and toured with him for about two decades, frequently performing Heifetz’s arrangements of classical works. He also helped facilitate new commissions, notably the Violin Concerto by Miklós Rózsa, which Heifetz premiered in 1956. Bay signed with Decca Records in the mid‑1940s, as did Heifetz. During his career, he performed with celebrated artists such as Mischa Elman, David Oistrakh, Zino Francescatti, Joseph Szigeti, Gregor Piatigorsky, Jan Peerce, and Richard Traubel.

In 1954, he retired from concert performance and turned to teaching. He became a professor of music at the University of Southern California and also taught piano at the Music Academy of the West in Santa Barbara, California.

He died in Jerusalem, Israel on December 2, 1967.
