= Ładawy =

- Village
- Location within Poland
- Coordinates: 52°0′16″N 18°54′13″E
- Country: Poland
- Voivodeship: Łódź
- County: Łęczyca
- Gmina: Świnice Warckie
- Population: 50

Ładawy [waˈdavɨ] is a village in the administrative district of Gmina Świnice Warckie, within Łęczyca County, Łódź Voivodeship, in central Poland.
