= Gmina Tuczna =

Gmina Tuczna Tuczna Commune
- Gmina
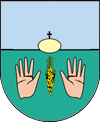
- Coat of arms
- Interactive map of Gmina Tuczna
- Coordinates (Tuczna): 51°53′N 23°26′E
- Country: Poland
- Voivodeship: Lublin
- County: Biała County
- Seat: Tuczna

Area
  - Total: 170.37 km^{2} (65.78 sq mi)

Population (2014)
  - Total: 3,246
  - Density: 19.05/km^{2} (49.35/sq mi)
- Website: http://www.gminatuczna.pl

Gmina Tuczna is a rural gmina (administrative district) in Biała County, Lublin Voivodeship, in eastern Poland. Its seat is the village of Tuczna, which lies approximately 28 kilometres (17 mi) south-east of Biała Podlaska and 93 km (58 mi) north-east of the regional capital Lublin.

The gmina covers an area of 170.37 square kilometres (65.8 sq mi), and as of 2006 its total population is 3,507 (3,246 in 2014).

== Villages ==
Gmina Tuczna contains the villages and settlements of Bokinka Królewska, Bokinka Pańska, Choroszczynka, Dąbrowica Duża, Kalichowszczyzna, Leniuszki, Matiaszówka, Mazanówka, Międzyleś, Ogrodniki, Rozbitówka, Tuczna, Wiski, Władysławów, Wólka Zabłocka, Wólka Zabłocka-Kolonia and Żuki.

== Neighbouring gminas ==
Gmina Tuczna is bordered by the gminas of Hanna, Kodeń, Łomazy, Piszczac, Sławatycze and Sosnówka.
