= Międzyleś, Lublin Voivodeship =

Międzyleś
- Village
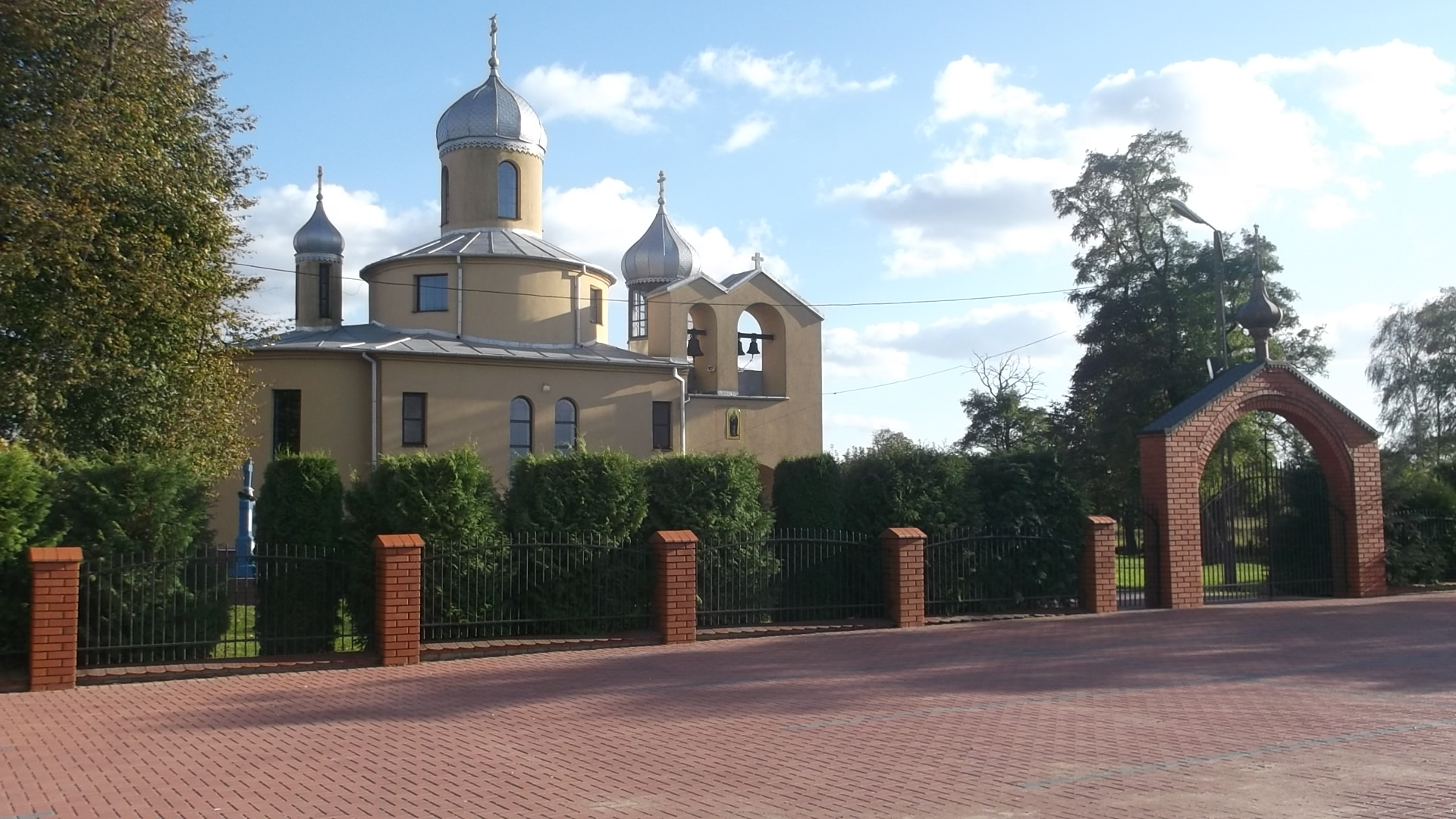
- Orthodox Church of St. Anna, Międzyleś

- Location within Poland
- Coordinates: 51°50′11″N 23°28′2″E
- Country: Poland
- Voivodeship: Lublin
- County: Biała
- Gmina: Tuczna

Population
  - Total: 340

Międzyleś [mʲɛnˈd͡zɨlɛɕ] is a village in the administrative district of Gmina Tuczna, within Biała County, Lublin Voivodeship, in eastern Poland.
