= Wiski, Gmina Tuczna =

Wiski
- Village
- Location within Poland
- Coordinates: 51°52′N 23°21′E
- Country: Poland
- Voivodeship: Lublin
- County: Biała
- Gmina: Tuczna

Wiski [ˈvʲiskʲi] is a village in the administrative district of Gmina Tuczna, within Biała County, Lublin Voivodeship, in eastern Poland.

It is the birthplace of Polish novelist, journalist and translator Edmund Chojecki (1822–1899).
