= Chorzepin =

- Village
- Location within Poland
- Coordinates: 52°4′N 18°52′E
- Country: Poland
- Voivodeship: Łódź
- County: Łęczyca
- Gmina: Świnice Warckie

Chorzepin [xɔˈʐɛpin] is a village in the administrative district of Gmina Świnice Warckie, within Łęczyca County, Łódź Voivodeship, in central Poland.
