= Łyków =

- Village
- Location within Poland
- Coordinates: 52°2′3″N 19°1′11″E
- Country: Poland
- Voivodeship: Łódź
- County: Łęczyca
- Gmina: Świnice Warckie

Łyków [ˈwɨkuf] is a village in the administrative district of Gmina Świnice Warckie, within Łęczyca County, Łódź Voivodeship, in central Poland.
