= Drozdowo =

Drozdowo may refer to the following places in Poland:

- Drozdowo, Kuyavian-Pomeranian Voivodeship (north-central Poland)
- Drozdowo, Maków County in Masovian Voivodeship (east-central Poland)
- Drozdowo, Podlaskie Voivodeship (north-east Poland)
- Drozdowo, Płońsk County in Masovian Voivodeship (east-central Poland)
- Drozdowo, Człuchów County in Pomeranian Voivodeship (north Poland)
- Drozdowo, Kartuzy County in Pomeranian Voivodeship (north Poland)
- Drozdowo, Olecko County in Warmian-Masurian Voivodeship (north Poland)
- Drozdowo, Pisz County in Warmian-Masurian Voivodeship (north Poland)
- Drozdowo, Gryfice County in West Pomeranian Voivodeship (north-west Poland)
- Drozdowo, Gryfino County in West Pomeranian Voivodeship (north-west Poland)
- Drozdowo, Kołobrzeg County in West Pomeranian Voivodeship (north-west Poland)
- Drozdowo, Sławno County in West Pomeranian Voivodeship (north-west Poland)
