= Drozdów =

Drozdów may refer to the following places:

- Drozdów, Łódź Voivodeship (central Poland)
- Drozdów, Lubusz Voivodeship (west Poland)
- Drozdów, Masovian Voivodeship (east-central Poland)
