= Wyganów, Łódź Voivodeship =

Wyganów
- Village
- Location within Poland
- Coordinates: 52°3′20″N 18°54′41″E
- Country: Poland
- Voivodeship: Łódź
- County: Łęczyca
- Gmina: Świnice Warckie

Wyganów [vɨˈɡanuf] is a village in the administrative district of Gmina Świnice Warckie, within Łęczyca County, Łódź Voivodeship, in central Poland.
