= Chęcin =

- Village
- Location within Poland
- Coordinates: 52°4′24″N 18°54′29″E
- Country: Poland
- Voivodeship: Łódź
- County: Łęczyca
- Gmina: Świnice Warckie

Chęcin [ˈxɛnt͡ɕin] is a village in the administrative district of Gmina Świnice Warckie, within Łęczyca County, Łódź Voivodeship, in central Poland.
