= Luba Drozd =

Ukrainian-American artist

- Born: 1982 (age 43–44); Lviv, Ukrainian SSR, Soviet Union (now Ukraine)
- Education: Pratt Institute; Milton Avery Graduate School of the Arts
- Awards: Guggenheim Fellow (2021)

Luba Drozd (born 1982) is an American installation artist.

== Biography ==
Drozd was born in 1982 in Lviv, then part of the Ukrainian Soviet Socialist Republic, and as an adolescent later emigrated to the United States. Drozd received a Bachelor of Arts degree in Computer Graphics and Interactive Media from Pratt Institute in 2006, then attended the Milton Avery Graduate School of the Arts, where she earned a Master of Fine Arts degree in Film/Video in 2015.

Drozd's early works were single and two channel animation and video. For Smack Mellon's 2015 show Respond, Drozd contributed Humane Restraint, a video installation which art critic Jillian Steinhauer said "mashes up cheery instructional videos from mental hospitals and police forces that teach viewers how to properly restrain people . . . [and hinges] brilliantly on the point at which humor quietly swings into seriousness." In that same year, she received a new work grant from the Eastern State Penitentiary for a two-channel video installation called Institute of Corrections, and was a BRIC Media Arts Fellow. In 2016, she was a Fall/Winter 2016-2017 artist resident for the Studios at MASS MoCA, and her piece Solipsism was included in CIM, an exhibition of seven contemporary Ukrainian-American Artists. In 2017 she was a Bronx Museum of the Arts AIM Fellow, with her installation piece subsequently included in that year's Bronx Museum Biennial. In 2017, Drozd had a solo show at Lubov (a gallery in Manhattan), called Soon enough Roads will be Rivers.

In 2018, Drozd received residencies at the Millay Colony for the Arts and the Virginia Center for the Creative Arts and exhibited within a group show at the Pfizer Building in Brooklyn. In 2019 Drozd received a MacDowell Colony Fellowship, and she and William Lamson worked on A Continuous Stream of Occurrence, an exhibition at the Knockdown Center. Her subsequent piece Tarsainn received support from the Foundation for Contemporary Arts through their emergency grant program. In late-2019, Drozd created a site specific piece at Sunview Luncheonette. In 2020, Drozd received a Yaddo residency. That same year, she also worked as part of A faint hum, a group installation at the Hessel Museum of Art. Rachel Vera Steinberg said that "Using piano strings, animated projection, sheet metal, micro-controllers, motors, and drywall, Drozd’s new installation yearns for a synesthetic equalization of matter."

During the COVID-19 pandemic in New York City, Drozd distributed 3D-printed face shields, based on a design by Prusa Research (the manufacturers of the Prusa i3 3D printers). The shields were designed to be "fabricated with acetate, a hole puncher from a discount store, and rubber bands". On March 30, 2020, a photograph of Drozd creating the masks appeared in a New York Times article on the rise of crowdsourced medical equipment during the pandemic. In May 2020, Drozd told arts magazine Bomb that "[m]uch of [her] art practice deals with the subjectivity of perception on both micro and macro levels." In 2021, Drozd was appointed a Guggenheim Fellow.

On February 24, 2022, Drozd, condemning the Russian invasion of Ukraine, took part in an anti-invasion march in Manhattan. She has family who remained in Ukraine after her emigration, and she wanted them to flee the country for their safety. She also voiced her "doubts [that] domestic and international pressure would deter [President of Russia Vladimir] Putin from pursuing his plan to take over Ukraine." In November 2022, she returned to Smack Mellon with The Tenacity of a Fluid Trace, an art installation incorporating drywall, piano wire, sheet metal, and steel beams to produce sound. Gregory Volk said that he "would hardly characterize [it] as a direct response to the war, yet correspondences are evident, especially in her deep feeling and respect for matter, in contrast with Putin’s senseless destruction."

== Awards ==
- 2015 BRIC Arts Media Media Arts Fellowship
- 2016 Eastern State Penitentiary New Work Grant
- 2016 MASS MoCA Visiting Artist in Residence
- 2017 Bronx Museum of the Arts AIM Fellowship
- 2018 VCCA Resident Artist Fellow
- 2018 Millay Colony for the Arts Artist Residency
- 2019 MacDowell Colony Fellowship
- 2019 Foundation for Contemporary Arts Emergency Grant
- 2020 Yaddo Residency
- 2020 Pioneer Works Technology Residency
- 2021 Guggenheim Fellow
