= Władysławów, Gmina Tuczna =

Władysławów
- Village
- Location within Poland
- Coordinates: 51°49′49″N 23°26′22″E
- Country: Poland
- Voivodeship: Lublin
- County: Biała
- Gmina: Tuczna

Władysławów [vwadɨˈswavuf] is a village in the administrative district of Gmina Tuczna, within Biała County, Lublin Voivodeship, in eastern Poland.
