= Paweł Chęciński =

Polish pianist

Paweł Chęciński (Pah-vel Hen-chin-ski) is a Polish pianist who settled in the United States in 1971.

Born in Łódź, Poland, Pawel Chęciński studied at the Fryderyk Chopin Music Academy in Warsaw. In 1971, Chęciński was awarded a Fulbright Grant to study at the Juilliard School. Chęciński received a special award in the Chopin International Piano Competition in Warsaw and was a prize winner in the Smetana International Competition in Czechoslovakia and the Sydney International Piano Competition in Australia.

He has widely performed both in the American concert scene and abroad, and has taught at the Pennsylvania State University, the University of British Columbia, Columbia College in Columbia, SC, and the Roosevelt University’s Chicago College of Performing Arts, where he served as the institution's artist-in-residence.

Pawel Chęciński died unexpectedly in his home of natural causes on June 24, 2025 at the age of 79.
