= Głogowiec, Łęczyca County =

Głogowiec
- Village
- Location within Poland
- Coordinates: 52°1′38″N 18°56′1″E
- Country: Poland
- Voivodeship: Łódź
- County: Łęczyca
- Gmina: Świnice Warckie

Głogowiec [ɡwɔˈɡɔvjɛt͡s] is a village in the administrative unit of Gmina Świnice Warckie, within Łęczyca County, Łódź Voivodeship, in central Poland.
