= Strachów, Łódź Voivodeship =

Strachów
- Village
- Location within Poland
- Coordinates: 52°3′34″N 18°58′52″E
- Country: Poland
- Voivodeship: Łódź
- County: Łęczyca
- Gmina: Świnice Warckie

Strachów [ˈstraxuf] is a village in the administrative district of Gmina Świnice Warckie, within Łęczyca County, Łódź Voivodeship, in central Poland.
