= Jarosław Drozd =

Polish diplomat (born 1955)

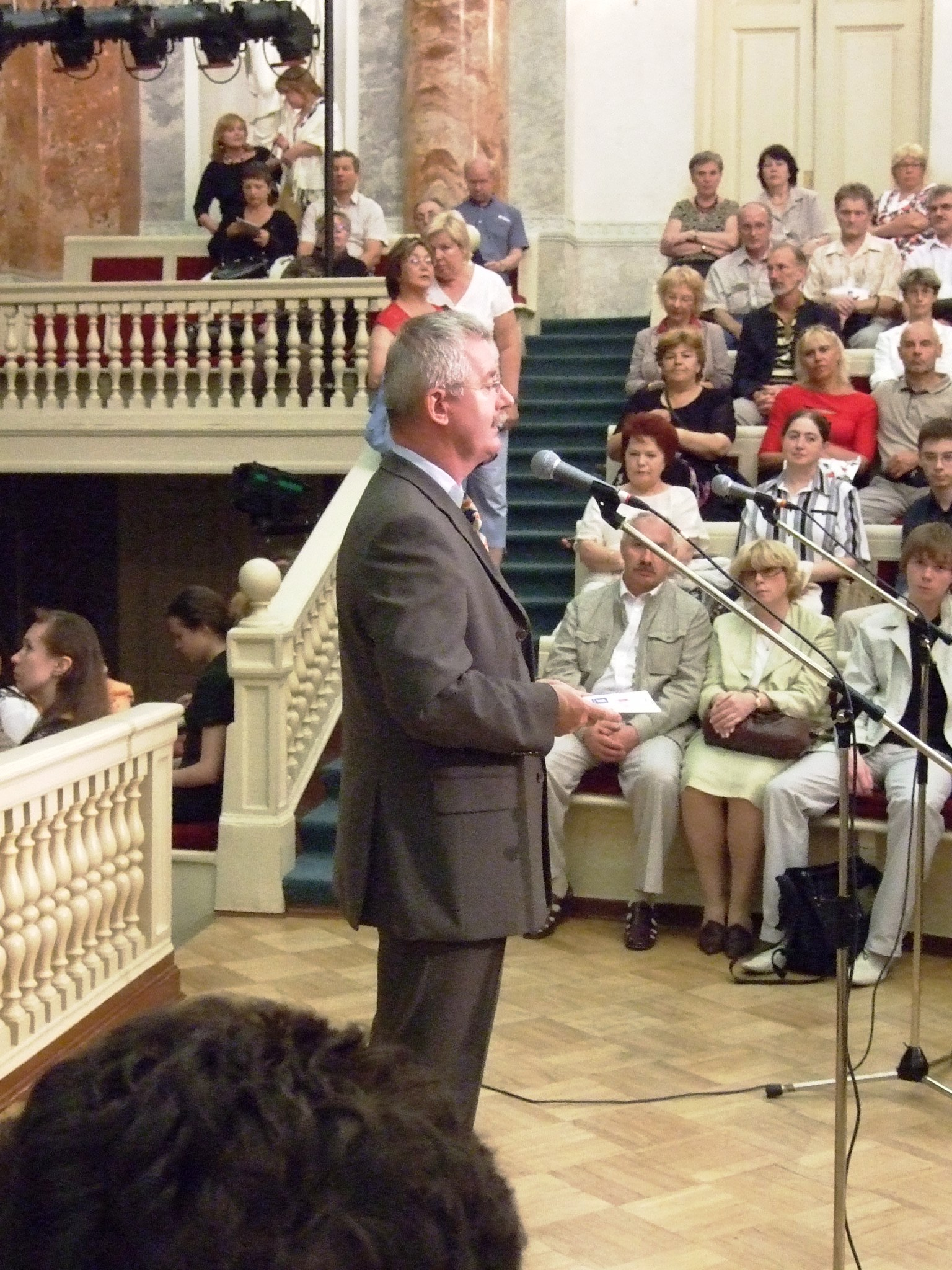
Drozd presents a Frédéric Chopin concert in Saint Petersburg

Jarosław Jerzy Drozd (born 1955 in Koszalin) is a Polish politologist and diplomat. He was serving as the Consul-General of Poland in Lille (1995-1999) Saint Petersburg (2007–2011) and Lviv (2011–2015).

Before this he was a professor of politology in Cardinal Stefan Wyszyński University in Warsaw getting his Dr. Sci degree in 1999. His dissertation was devoted to the German-Polish military cooperation in 1989–1997.
