= Drozdów, Łódź Voivodeship =

Drozdów
- Village
- Location within Poland
- Coordinates: 52°1′27″N 19°0′3″E
- Country: Poland
- Voivodeship: Łódź
- County: Łęczyca
- Gmina: Świnice Warckie

Drozdów [ˈdrɔzduf] is a village in the administrative district of Gmina Świnice Warckie, within Łęczyca County, Łódź Voivodeship, in central Poland.
