= La Tribune des Peuples =

1849 French political magazine

La Tribune des Peuples (French pronunciation: [la tʁibyn de pœpl], The People's Tribune; Polish: Trybuna Ludów) was a Polish-led French-language radical and romantic nationalist political daily magazine, published in Paris between March and November 1849 - except for a hiatus caused by censorship (14 April-31 August). The founder and editor-in-chief was Adam Mickiewicz, one of the greatest Polish poets.

Among the co-workers were liberal activists and commentators of different nationalities, belonging to the émigré communities of 1848 revolutionaries. The magazine propagated ideas of international solidarity and the power of revolutions in the fight for liberation of nations and societies; it pointed out the reactionary character of the policies of Imperial Russia and the Holy See.

As a result of the intervention of the Russian embassy of Nicholas I, the headquarters of the magazine were closed by the French police force on 10 November, 1849.

Mickiewicz's contributions were collected by his son, Władysław, translated into Polish by Antoni Krasnowolski and published in Warsaw (Biblioteka Naukowa) in 1907.

The paper included the first French translation of the American author Ralph Waldo Emerson.

== Notable co-workers ==
- Nicolae Bălcescu
- Franciszek Ksawery Godebski

== See also ==
- Great Emigration
