= Arkadiusz Chęciński =

Polish politician (born 1971)

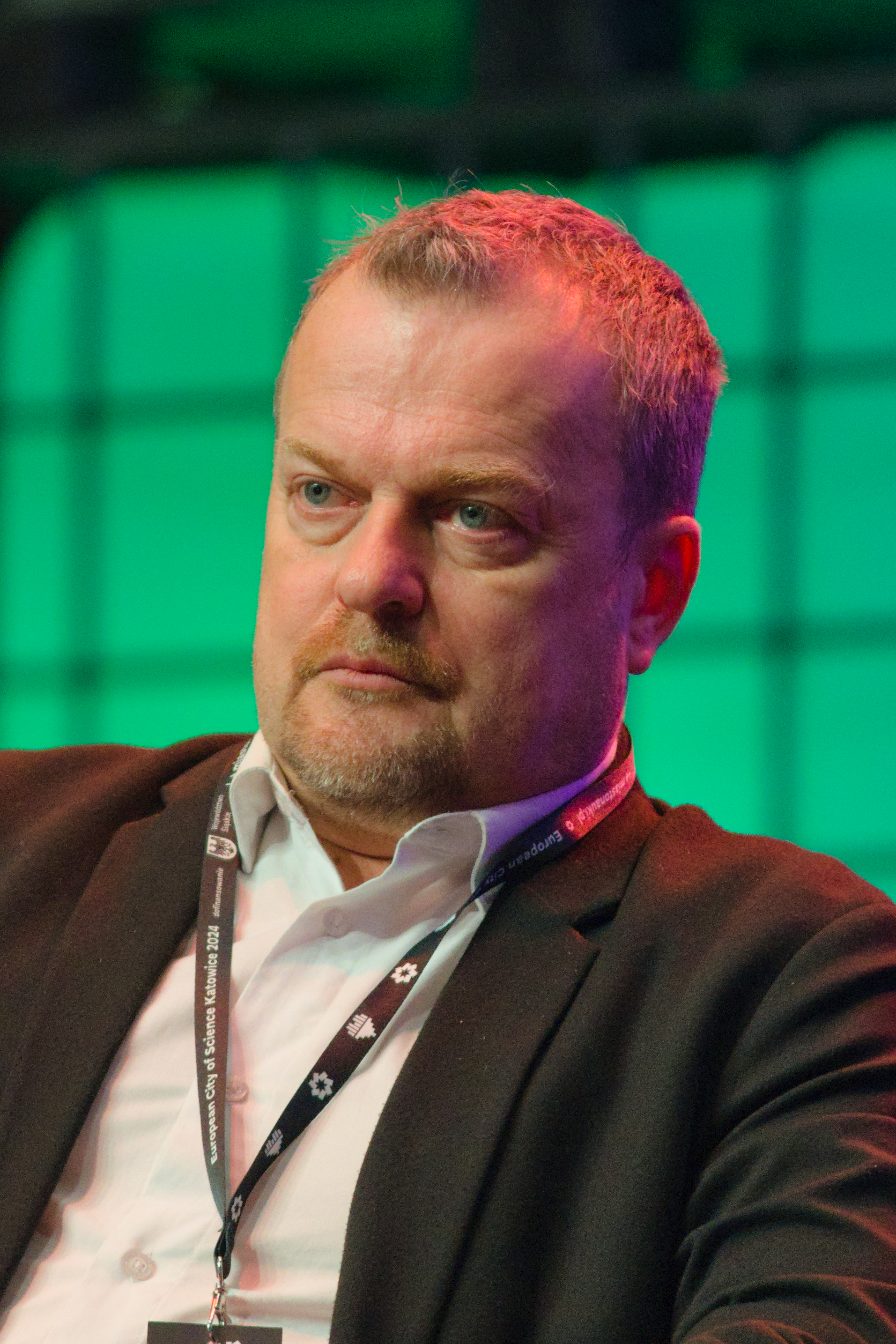
- Arkadiusz Chęciński in 2024

Mayor of Sosnowiec
- Incumbent
- Assumed office 2014

Personal details
- Born: 5 June 1971 (age 55) Sosnowiec, Poland
- Party: Civic Platform
- Education: Wyższa Szkoła Humanitas in Sosnowiec

Arkadiusz Janusz Chęciński (born 5 June 1971) is a Polish politician who has served as mayor of Sosnowiec since 2014.

== Memoir ==
Arkadiusz Chęciński was born in Sosnowiec on 5 June 1971. He graduated Wyższa Szkoła Humanitas in Sosnowiec. He's associated with Civic Platform. In 2006, Chęciński unsuccessfully tried to get a City Council mandate. In next term of City Council he finally got a Councilor mandate. In 2013, he was elected to the management of Silesian Voivodeship.

Since 2014 Chęciński is the mayor of Sosnowiec city. In 2018, he was elected on second term (66,7% votes).

During the parliament campaign in 2019 he was supporting Mateusz Bochenek.
