= Władysławów, Łęczyca County =

Władysławów
- Village
- Location within Poland
- Coordinates: 52°2′26″N 19°1′41″E
- Country: Poland
- Voivodeship: Łódź
- County: Łęczyca
- Gmina: Świnice Warckie

Władysławów [vwadɨˈswavuf] is a village in the administrative district of Gmina Świnice Warckie, within Łęczyca County, Łódź Voivodeship, in central Poland.
