= Andrzej Drozdowski =

Polish footballer (born 1950)

Personal information
- Date of birth: 22 October 1950 (age 76)
- Place of birth: Pabianice, Poland
- Height: 1.78 m (5 ft 10 in)
- Position: Midfielder

Senior career*
| Years | Team | Apps | (Gls) |
| –1970 | Włókniarz Pabianice | | |
| 1970–1971 | Zawisza Bydgoszcz | | |
| 1972–1981 | ŁKS Łódź | 185 | (15) |
| 1982–1984 | Rovaniemen Palloseura | | |

International career
| 1973–1974 | Poland | 7 | (0) |
- * Club domestic league appearances and goals

Andrzej Drozdowski (born 22 October 1950) is a Polish former professional footballer who played as a midfielder.

He made seven appearances for the Poland national team from 1973 to 1974.
