= Drozdov (Beroun District) =

- Municipality
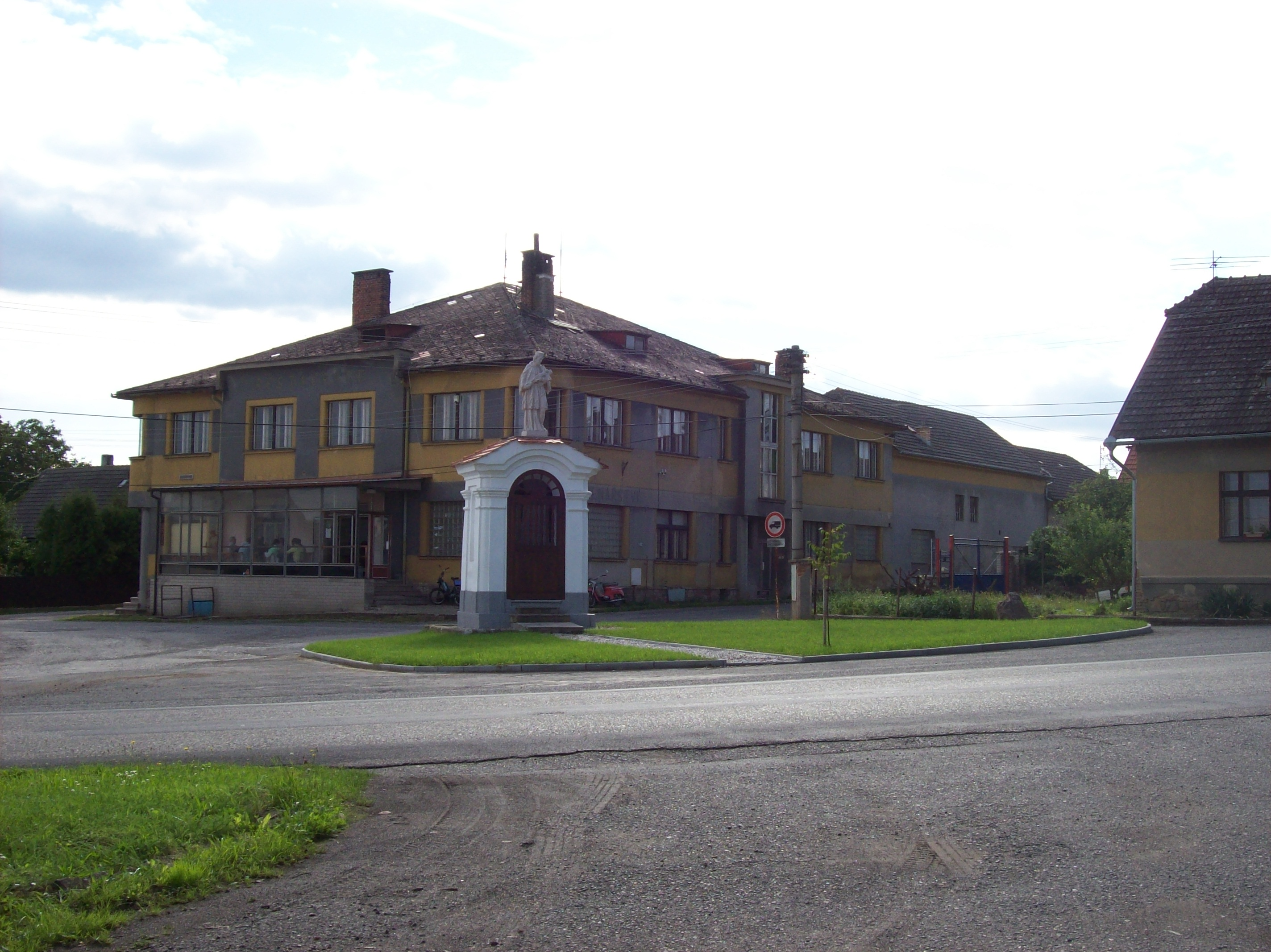
- Chapel with a statue of St. John of Nepomuk

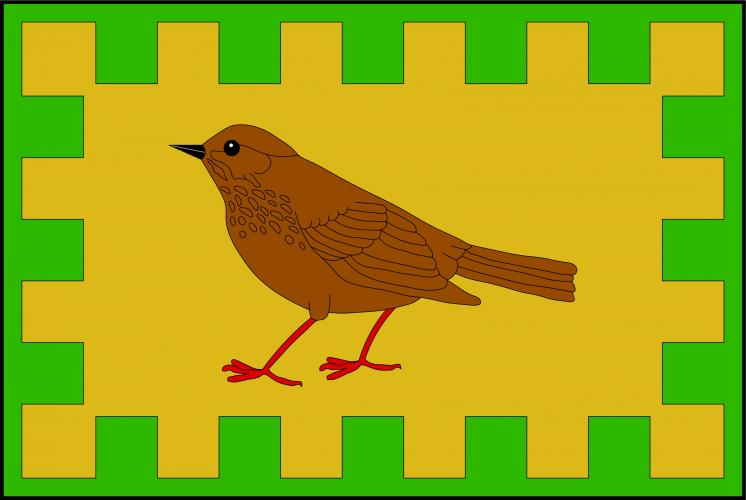
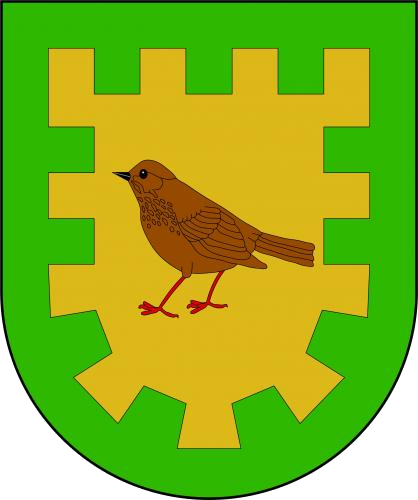
- Flag Coat of arms

- Location in the Czech Republic
- Coordinates: 49°51′48″N 13°50′26″E
- Country: Czech Republic
- Region: Central Bohemian
- District: Beroun
- First mentioned: 1368

Area
  - Total: 10.03 km^{2} (3.87 sq mi)
- Elevation: 390 m (1,280 ft)

Population (2026-01-01)
  - Total: 807
  - Density: 80.5/km^{2} (208/sq mi)
- Time zone: UTC+1 (CET)
  - Summer (DST): UTC+2 (CEST)
- Postal code: 267 61
- Website: www.obecdrozdov.eu

Drozdov is a municipality and village in Beroun District in the Central Bohemian Region of the Czech Republic. It has about 800 inhabitants.

== History ==
The first written mention of Drozdov is from 1368.

== Demographics ==
Historical population
Year	Pop.	±%
1869	691	—
1880	713	+3.2%
1890	689	−3.4%
1900	686	−0.4%
1910	802	+16.9%
1921	786	−2.0%
1930	800	+1.8%
1950	743	−7.1%
1961	778	+4.7%
1970	766	−1.5%
1980	719	−6.1%
1991	651	−9.5%
2001	640	−1.7%
2011	712	+11.3%
2021	773	+8.6%
Source: Censuses
