= Christine Checinska =

British womenswear designer and art historian

Academic background
- Education: University of London (PhD); University of the West of England, Bristol (BA, MA)
- Thesis: Colonizin in reverse! The creolised aesthetic of the empire windrush generation. (2010)
- Website: Christine Checinska

Christine Shaw-Checinska is a British Jamaican womenswear designer, curator and art historian. She is the inaugural Senior Curator of African and African Diaspora Fashion and Textiles at the Victoria and Albert Museum. Her work considers the relationship between cloth, culture and race.

== Early life and education ==
Checinska studied fashion and textile design at the University of the West of England in Bristol and graduate with a bachelor's degree in fashion and textile design in 1986. She earned a master's degree at the Surrey Institute of Art & Design in 2002. Checinska moved to Goldsmiths, University of London for her doctoral studies, where she studied the aesthetic of the Windrush generation. She was a postdoctoral researcher at the University of East London Checinska worked with Iniva (the Institute for International Visual Arts) on several projects, including Cloth & Differences and Social Fabric, which explored textiles and social processes. She established the Clothes, Cloth and Culture Group at Iniva's Stuart Hall Library in 2013.

== Research and career ==
Checinska was appointed as a Lecturer in Fashion at Goldsmiths, University of London, and held a joint position at the University of Johannesburg, Visual Identities in Art and Design Research Centre. She has worked as a freelance fashion designer, leading collections for Margaret Howell. Her work considers the relationship between cloth, culture and race; exploring themes such as colonialism and international trade.

In 2016 her show The Arrivants debuted at the University of Johannesburg FADA (Faculty of Art, Design and Architecture) Gallery. The Arrivants considered the intersection of race, culture and fashion, with a particular focus on the role of dress in the negotiation of social borders. Later that year, she delivered a TED Talk that explored fashion as everyday activism. During her talk she coined the phrase "Craftivist".

In 2020, Checinska became the inaugural Curator of African and African Diaspora Fashion at the Victoria and Albert Museum. She is Lead Curator of the Victoria and Albert Museum's major exhibition Africa Fashion (July 2022–April 2023).
