= Vladimir Drozdov =

Russian-American pianist (1882–1960)

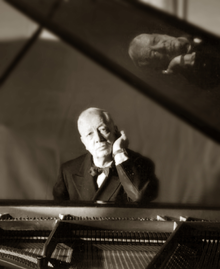
- Vladimir Drozdov
- Born: May 25, 1882; Saratov, Russian Empire
- Died: March 10, 1960 (aged 77); New York City, U.S.
- Education: Saratov Conservatory; Saint Petersburg Conservatory
- Occupations: Pianist, composer
- Spouse: Anna Schweiger

Vladimir Nikolayevich Drozdov (/ˈdrɒzdɒf/ DROZ-dof; May 25, 1882 [O.S. May 18] – March 10, 1960) was a Russian‑American pianist and composer. A pupil of Nikolai Rimsky-Korsakov, he performed widely across Europe and the United States and authored 132 compositions, including four piano sonatas. He co-founded the Pushkin Society in America.

== Early life ==
Drozdov was born in Saratov, Russian Empire, to Nikolai Vasilyevich Drozdov, a pianist and composer, and Olga Alexandrovna Balmasheva-Drozdova, a music teacher at the Saratov Music College. He was the eldest of three sons. His younger brother Anatoly N. Drozdov became a noted teacher of music theory, and Valerian N. Drozdov became a violinist.

He began his education at the Saratov Real School and studied music at the Saratov Music College (now the Saratov Conservatory). He went on to attend the Saint Petersburg Conservatory, where he studied piano with Anna Yesipova and composition with Nikolai Rimsky-Korsakov. There, Drozdeov was the uncontested Gold Medal winner of the Rubinstein Prize. He later studied under Theodor Leschetizky in Vienna.

== Career ==
After graduating from the Saint Petersburg Conservatory, Drozdov embarked on multiple tours of Europe at age 24 in which critics compared him to Alfred Reisenauer and Ferruccio Busoni. In 1907, he began teaching at the Saint Petersburg Conservatory, becoming a senior piano instructor in 1908 and a professor of piano in 1914. He continued teaching as a professor under the directorship of Alexander Glazunov until 1917. His colleagues at the conservatory included Nikolai Rimsky-Korsakov, Anna Yesipova, Anatoly Lyadov, Nikolai Tcherepnin, and Leopold Auer, and it was at the conservatory that he met Sergei Rachmaninoff. He taught several notable pianists, including Emanuel Bay, Maria Yudina, and Pauline Heifetz, the sister of renowned violinist Jascha Heifetz.

After the Russian Revolution, Drozdov fled from Russia with his wife in 1920. They moved to Istanbul in the Ottoman Empire for 3 years before settling in the United States in 1922 with sponsorship from the Red Cross. Drozdov made his American debut in 1926 with the Detroit Symphony under Ossip Gabrilovitch. He performed concerts across the United States and appeared frequently on the New York concert stage, first performing in 1922 at Aeolian Hall in Manhattan. At least once a year, he performed with his children Paul and Nathalie, who each became musicians. He recorded dozens of pieces from the classical repertoire through labels including Melodiya, Welte-Mignon, and Paraclete.

Drozdov taught in his studio in New York City, where he resided until his retirement in 1957. Drozdov composed 132 unique pieces including four piano sonatas and some works for voice. His American publishers were John Markert & Co., Carl Fischer Music, and Omega Music.

He died on March 11, 1960, in New York. The composer's original manuscripts are in the Science Library of the Saint Petersburg Conservatory and in the Drozdov family collection.

== Personal life ==
While at the Saint Petersburg Conservatory, Drozdov met and later married Anna Schweiger, a talented graduate of the conservatory. They opened a piano studio together at 204 W 81st St in the Upper West Side of Manhattan. Their children, Natalia Drozdova and Pavel Drozdov (d. 1958), both studied music in their father's studio. They performed concerts together and as soloists.

Drozdov lived at 14 Alvin St in Glen Cove on the North Shore of Long Island in New York. He had four grandchildren, including Natasha Cherny, who co-founded the Drozdoff Society in The Bronx.

== Bibliography ==
- "Vladimir Drozdoff, Pianist-Teacher, 80". The New York Times. March 12, 1960.
- "Drozdoff Makes Debut; Russian Pianist Interprets Chopin in A-flat". The New York Times. February 8, 1926.
- Daugherty, Lindsay (October 30, 2018). "Visiting musicians celebrate Russian composer". Yale Daily News.
- "Category: Drozdov, Vladimir". IMSLP.
- "Vladimir Drozdoff, Russian Pianist, Presents Long and Exacting …". The New York Times. January 28, 1947.
- Kopytova, Galina (2013). Jascha Heifetz: Early Years in Russia. Indiana University Press. pp. 120, 220–221, 269. ISBN 9780253010896.
- Wilson, Elizabeth (2022). Playing with Fire: The Story of Maria Yudina, Pianist in Stalin's Russia. Yale University Press. pp. 56, 64. ISBN 9780300253931.
- Makaryk, Irena R.; Tkacz, Virlana, eds. (2010). Modernism in Kyiv: Jubilant Experimentation. University of Toronto Press. p. 324. ISBN 9781442640986.
- Vorobyev, Igorʹ (2004). Peterburg muzyka, 1703–2003 XX 1900-1957 (in Russian). Kompozitor.
- Zaltsberg, Ernst (1999). "Russian Rebel Marina Yudina". Clavier. 38. Instrumentalist Company.
- Harrison, Max (2006). Sergei Rachmaninoff: Life, Works, Recordings. Continuum / Bloomsbury. p. 174. ISBN 9780826493125.
