= Czeszów =

- Village
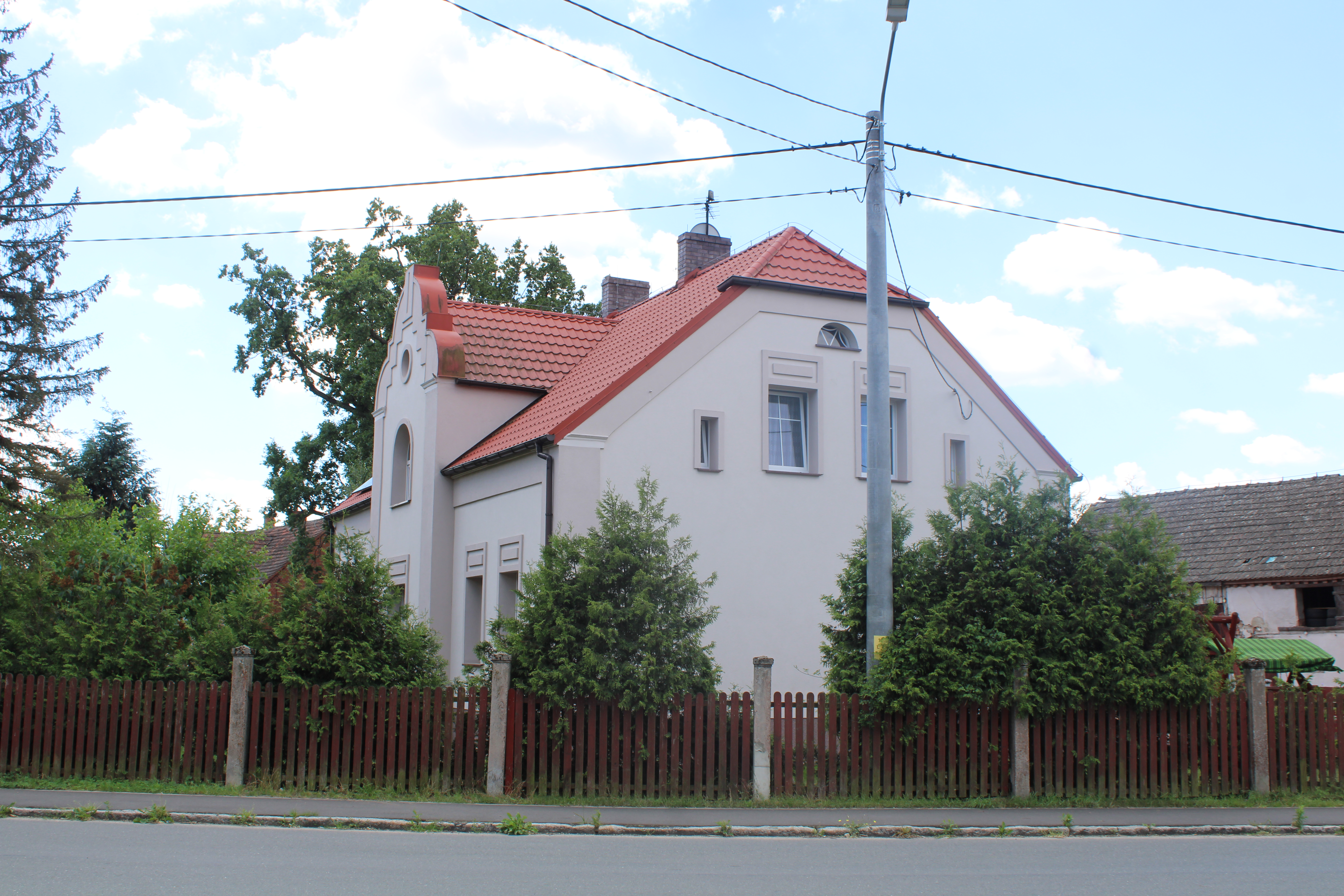

- Location within Poland
- Coordinates: 51°23′N 17°15′E
- Country: Poland
- Voivodeship: Lower Silesian
- County: Trzebnica
- Gmina: Zawonia
- Population (approx.): 970

Czeszów [ˈt͡ʂɛʂuf] (German: Deutsch-Hammer) is a village in the administrative district of Gmina Zawonia, within Trzebnica County, Lower Silesian Voivodeship, in south-western Poland which houses roughly 970 people.

== History ==
=== Tumulus Culture ===
While not proven, there is possibility that Czeszów has been inhabited since the Bronze Age. Several hills near the village have potential to be Tumulus culture Burial Mounds, known as barrows, but there is no evidence.

=== World War 2 ===
After assumption of Polish rule after the Second World War, 700 locals were deported to the remainder of Germany on December 1, 1945. Following this, many Polish settlers moved to Czeszów, many coming from Eastern regions. This population exchange resulted in a significant change in the village's ethnic and cultural makeup.

== Geographic Location and Landscape ==
Czeszów lies approximately 9 km (6 mi) north-east of Zawonia, 16 km (10 mi) north-east of Trzebnica, and 33 km (21 mi) north-east of the regional capital Wrocław.

In the south of the village, the Sąsiecznica river runs through, passing a split man-made lake built next to it. The village is situated in an area of forests, rolling hills and some small local farms.

== Infrastructure ==
A high-pressure natural gas transmission pipeline between Czeszów and Kiełczów was completed in 2018. The pipeline forms part of a regional upgrade of energy infrastructure, improving the reliability of gas supply in Lower Silesia. German roads and bridges built during the Second World War remain today in the forest area, hidden by trees from above. Most of the streams the bridges used to cross have evaporated today, leaving only small puddles.

== Locations in Czeszów ==
ul. Leśna 3: The village is served by the Roman Catholic parish of the Sacred Heart of Jesus here. The parish operates locally with regular services.

ul. Trzebnicka 3: Czeszów has a village community hall (Centrum Inicjatyw Lokalnych) administered by the municipal cultural center. It is used for local meetings and events. It is simultaneously a library too.

ul. Milicka 7: Czeszów maintains a Volunteer Fire Brigade (OSP Czeszów) registered as an association within the village. Local accounts trace the beginnings of the unit to 1947.

ul. Marii Konopnickiej 18: The village hosts a primary school named after Fr. Wawrzyniec Bochenek, which also serves as a venue for community activities.
