= Ujeździec Mały =

- Village
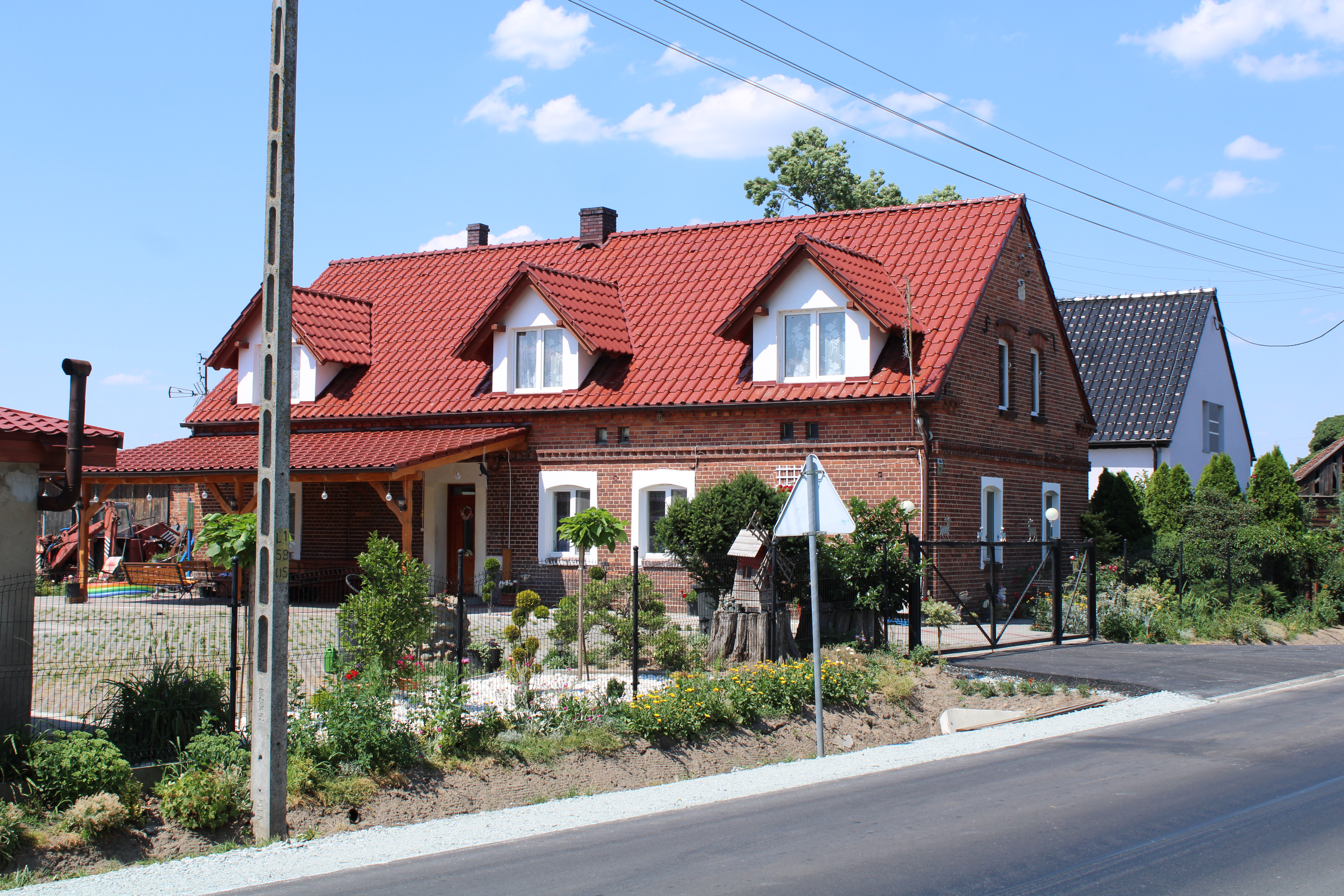

- Location within Poland
- Coordinates: 51°26′N 17°7′E
- Country: Poland
- Voivodeship: Lower Silesian
- County: Trzebnica
- Gmina: Trzebnica

Ujeździec Mały [uˈjɛʑd͡ʑɛt͡s ˈmawɨ] is a village in the administrative district of Gmina Trzebnica, within Trzebnica County, Lower Silesian Voivodeship, in south-western Poland.

The settlement is home to the headquarters of the Tarczyński Group, a meat produce joint-stock company founded in 1989 in Sułów.
