= Kobylice (disambiguation) =

Kobylice is a municipality and village in the Czech Republic.

Kobylice may also refer to:

- Kobylice, Lower Silesian Voivodeship (south-west Poland)
- Kobylice, Opole Voivodeship (south-west Poland)
