= Tarnowiec =

Tarnowiec may refer to:

- Tarnowiec, Lower Silesian Voivodeship (south-west Poland)
- Tarnowiec, Lesser Poland Voivodeship (south Poland)
- Tarnowiec, Subcarpathian Voivodeship (south-east Poland)
- Tarnowiec, Nowy Tomyśl County in Greater Poland Voivodeship (west-central Poland)
- Tarnowiec, Złotów County in Greater Poland Voivodeship (west-central Poland)
- Tarnowiec, Opole Voivodeship (south-west Poland)
- Tarnowiec, West Pomeranian Voivodeship (north-west Poland)
