= Masłów, Lower Silesian Voivodeship =

Masłów
- Village
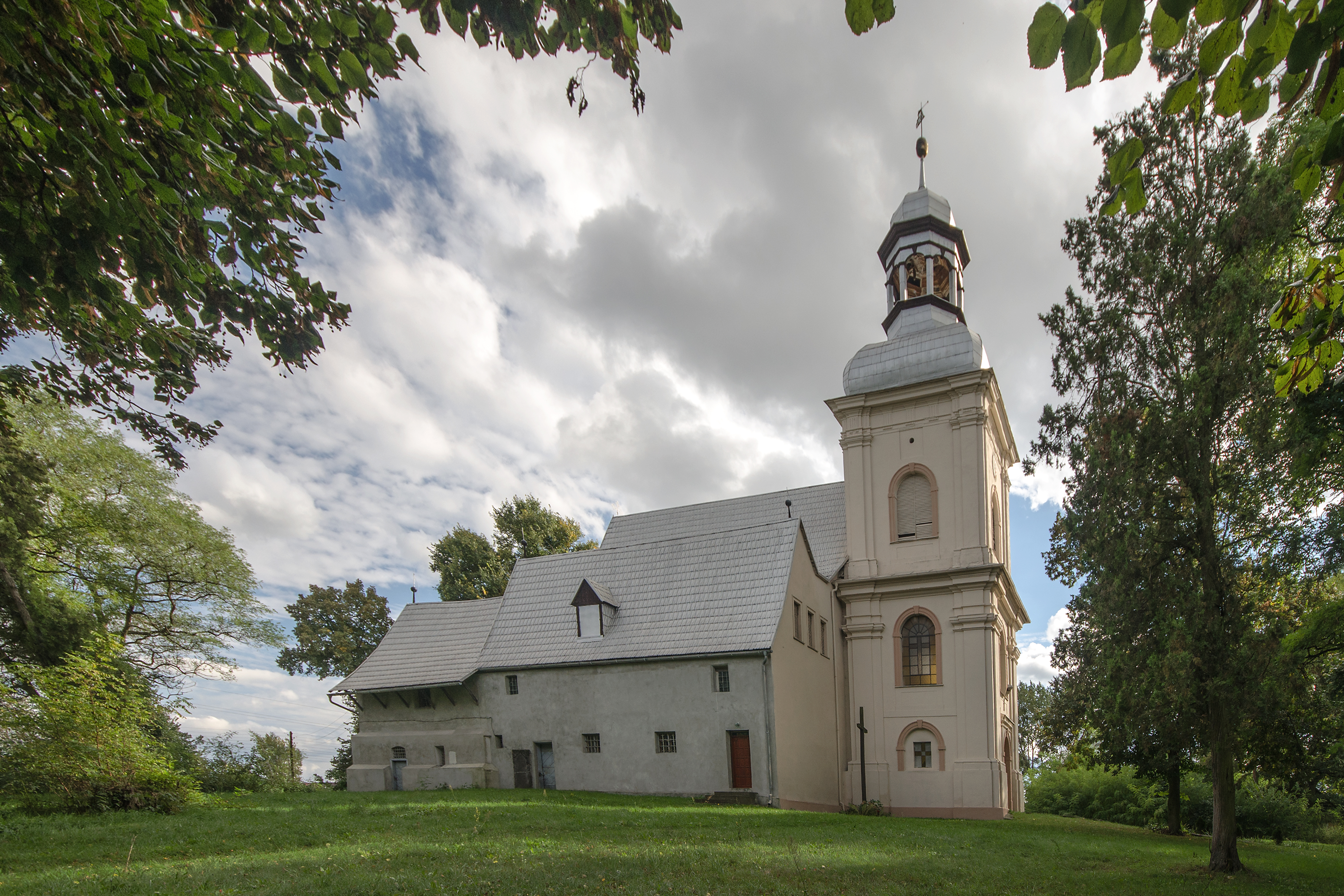
- Virgin Mary of Perpetual Help church in Masłów

- Location within Poland
- Coordinates: 51°20′22″N 17°07′36″E
- Country: Poland
- Voivodeship: Lower Silesian
- County: Trzebnica
- Gmina: Trzebnica

Masłów [ˈmaswuf] is a village in the administrative district of Gmina Trzebnica, within Trzebnica County, Lower Silesian Voivodeship, in southwestern Poland.

== History ==
While in most of the surrounding villages, Germans had already been expelled in 1946, Massel's populace was deported only in mid-1947.
