= Kuźniczysko =

- Village
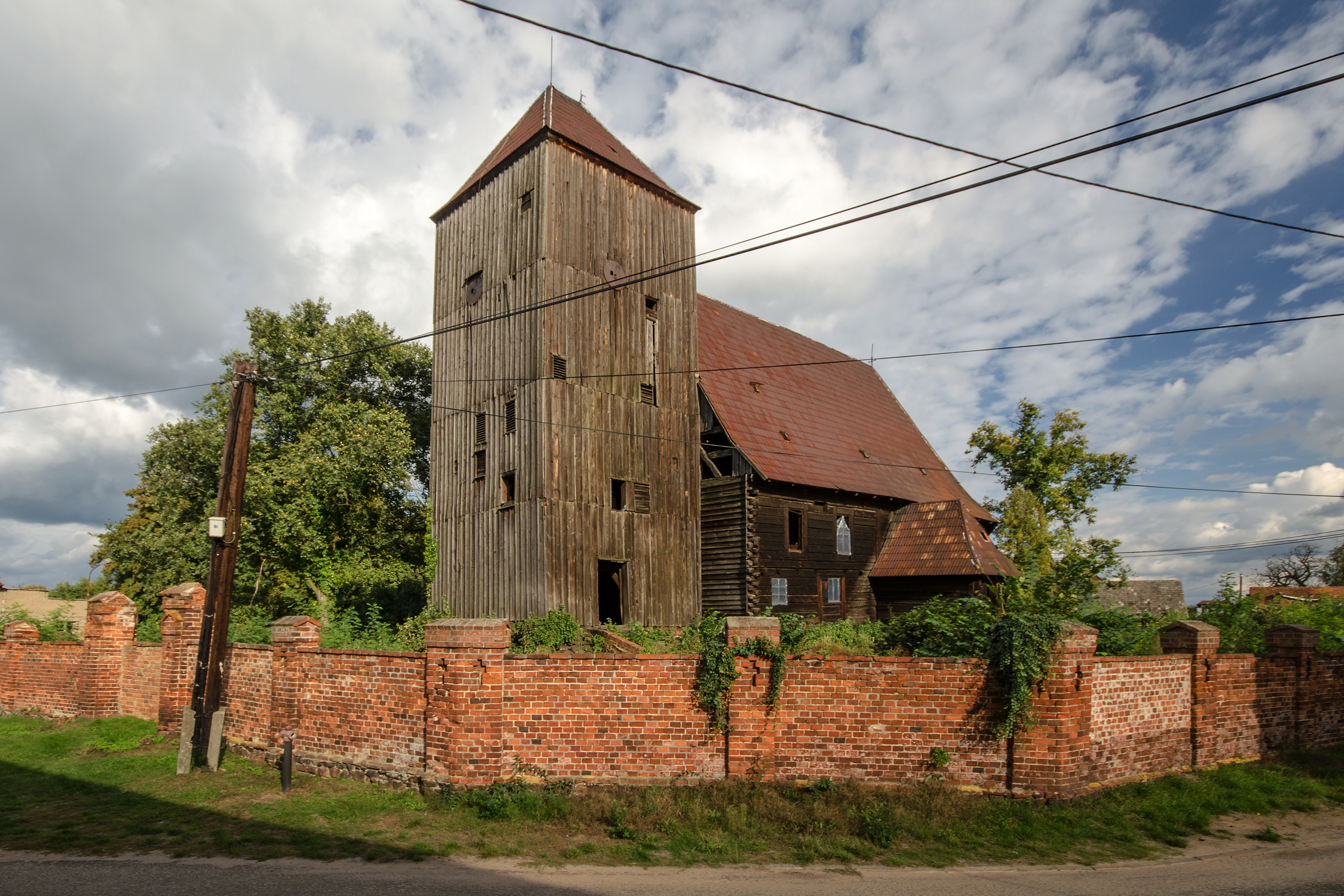
- Church in Kuźniczysko

- Location within Poland
- Coordinates: 51°22′31″N 17°10′58″E
- Country: Poland
- Voivodeship: Lower Silesian
- County: Trzebnica
- Gmina: Trzebnica

Kuźniczysko [kuʑɲiˈt͡ʂɨskɔ] is a village in the administrative district of Gmina Trzebnica, within Trzebnica County, Lower Silesian Voivodeship, in south-western Poland.
