= Węgrzynów, Trzebnica County =

Węgrzynów
- Village
- Location within Poland
- Coordinates: 51°17′16″N 17°01′03″E
- Country: Poland
- Voivodeship: Lower Silesian
- County: Trzebnica
- Gmina: Trzebnica

Węgrzynów [vɛŋˈɡʐɨnuf] is a village in the administrative district of Gmina Trzebnica, within Trzebnica County, Lower Silesian Voivodeship, in south-western Poland.
