= Pęciszów =

- Village
- Location within Poland
- Coordinates: 51°21′14″N 17°11′17″E
- Country: Poland
- Voivodeship: Lower Silesian
- County: Trzebnica
- Gmina: Zawonia

Pęciszów [pɛnˈt͡ɕiʂuf] is a village in the administrative district of Gmina Zawonia, within Trzebnica County, Lower Silesian Voivodeship, in south-western Poland.
