= Maluszyn =

Maluszyn may refer to the following places in Poland:

- Maluszyn, Łódź Voivodeship (central Poland)
- Małuszyn, Lower Silesian Voivodeship (south-west Poland)
- Maluszyn, Masovian Voivodeship (east-central Poland)
