= Prawocice =

- Village
- Location within Poland
- Coordinates: 51°17′14″N 17°15′31″E
- Country: Poland
- Voivodeship: Lower Silesian
- County: Trzebnica
- Gmina: Zawonia

Prawocice [pravɔˈt͡ɕit͡sɛ] is a village in the administrative district of Gmina Zawonia, within Trzebnica County, Lower Silesian Voivodeship, in south-western Poland.
