= Malczów =

- Village
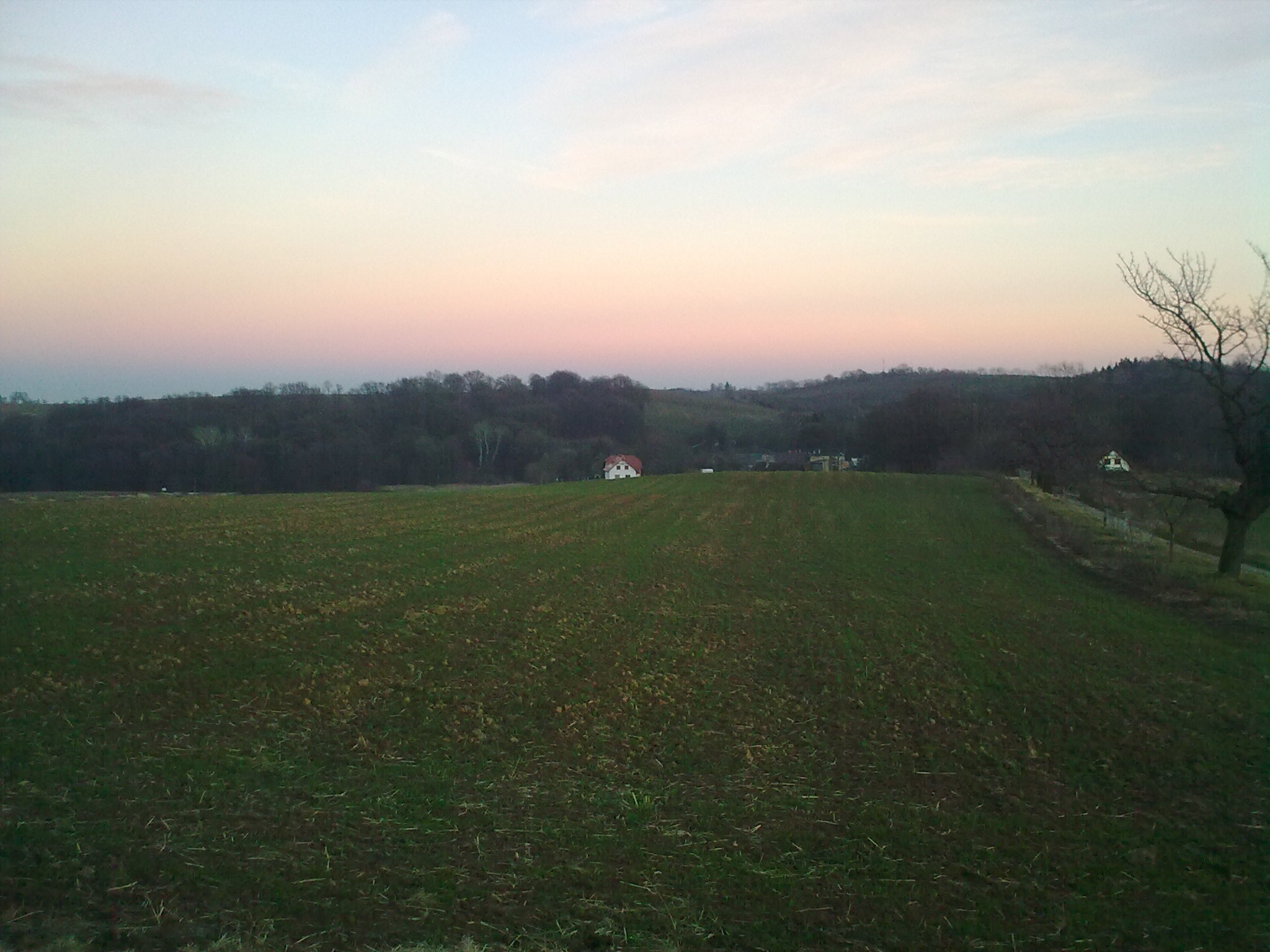

- Location within Poland
- Coordinates: 51°18′36″N 17°00′16″E
- Country: Poland
- Voivodeship: Lower Silesian
- County: Trzebnica
- Gmina: Trzebnica

Malczów [ˈmalt͡ʂuf] is a village in the administrative district of Gmina Trzebnica, within Trzebnica County, Lower Silesian Voivodeship, in south-western Poland.
