= Sucha Wielka =

- Village
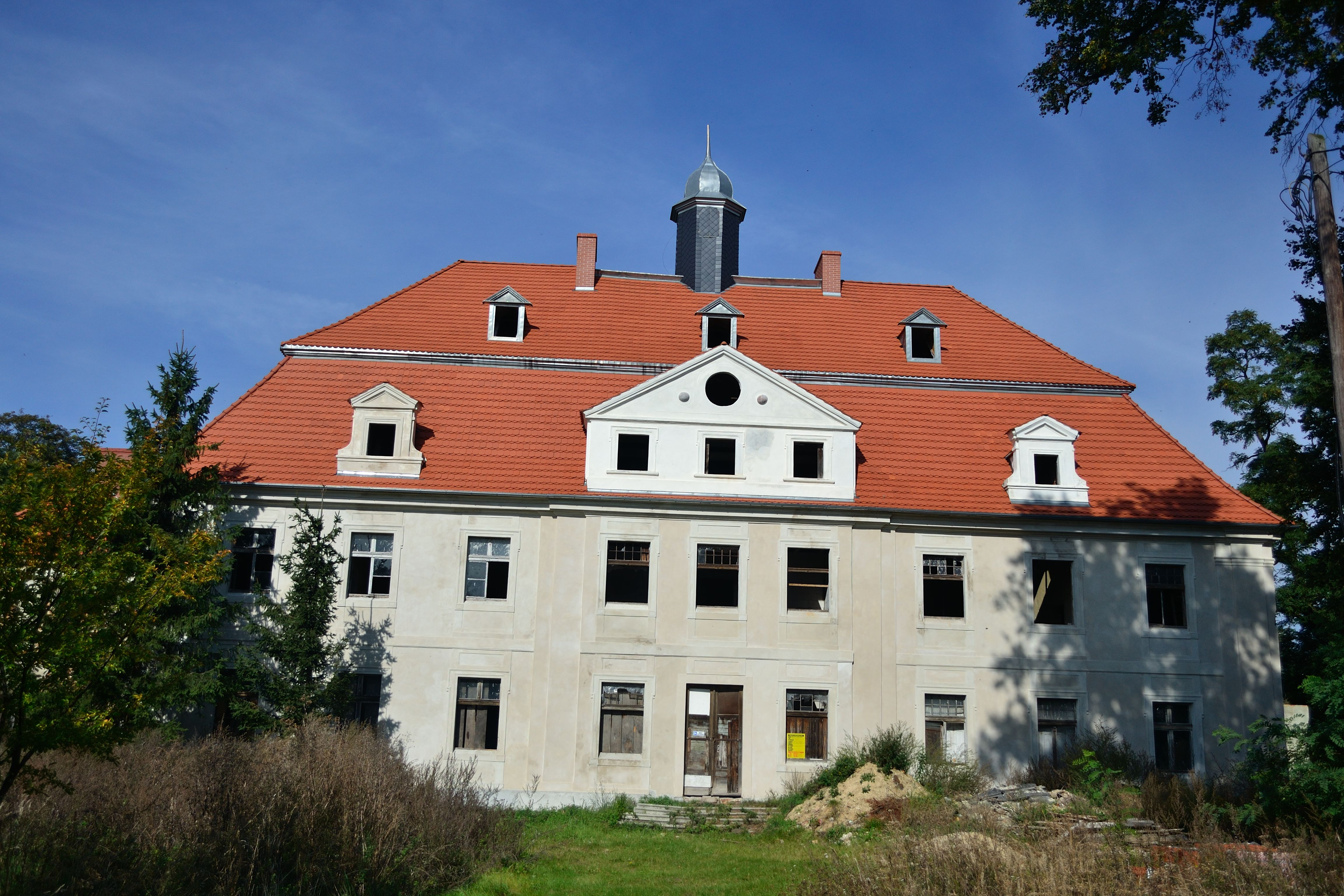

- Location within Poland
- Coordinates: 51°19′29″N 17°9′39″E
- Country: Poland
- Voivodeship: Lower Silesian
- County: Trzebnica
- Gmina: Zawonia

Sucha Wielka [ˈsuxa ˈvjɛlka] is a village in the administrative district of Gmina Zawonia, within Trzebnica County, Lower Silesian Voivodeship, in south-western Poland.

== Monuments ==
The following is entered in the provincial register of monuments :

- palace and farm complex:
  - a palace from the late 18th/19th century, located on the outskirts of the village
  - outbuilding, from the mid-19th century
  - residential house, from 1910
  - two farm buildings, from the second half of the 19th century, 1910
  - dovecote, from the end of the 18th century
  - barn, from 1860
  - pigsty, from the second half of the 19th century
  - fence, brick, from the turn of the 18th/19th century, early 20th century
  - park, from the 18th century, second half of the 19th century, beginning of the 20th century
