= Brzyków, Lower Silesian Voivodeship =

Brzyków
- Village
- Location within Poland
- Coordinates: 51°21′18″N 17°03′21″E
- Country: Poland
- Voivodeship: Lower Silesian
- County: Trzebnica
- Gmina: Trzebnica

Brzyków [ˈbʐɨkuf] is a village in the administrative district of Gmina Trzebnica, within Trzebnica County, Lower Silesian Voivodeship, in south-western Poland.
