= Złotów (disambiguation) =

Złotów is a town in Greater Poland Voivodeship (west-central Poland).

Złotów may also refer to:

- Złotów County
- Złotów, Lower Silesian Voivodeship, a village in Trzebnica County (southwest Poland)
