= Miłonowice =

- Village
- Location within Poland
- Coordinates: 51°16′37″N 17°12′40″E
- Country: Poland
- Voivodeship: Lower Silesian
- County: Trzebnica
- Gmina: Zawonia

Miłonowice [miwɔnɔˈvit͡sɛ] is a village in the administrative district of Gmina Zawonia, within Trzebnica County, Lower Silesian Voivodeship, in south-western Poland.
