= Świątniki, Trzebnica County =

Świątniki
- Village
- Location within Poland
- Coordinates: 51°18′13″N 17°06′02″E
- Country: Poland
- Voivodeship: Lower Silesian
- County: Trzebnica
- Gmina: Trzebnica

Świątniki (Polish pronunciation: [ɕfjɔntˈɲikʲi]) is a village in the administrative district of Gmina Trzebnica, within Trzebnica County, Lower Silesian Voivodeship, in south-western Poland.
