= Cielętniki =

Cielętniki may refer to the following places in Poland:

- Cielętniki, Lower Silesian Voivodeship (south-west Poland)
- Cielętniki, Silesian Voivodeship (south Poland)
