= Brochocin, Trzebnica County =

Brochocin
- Village
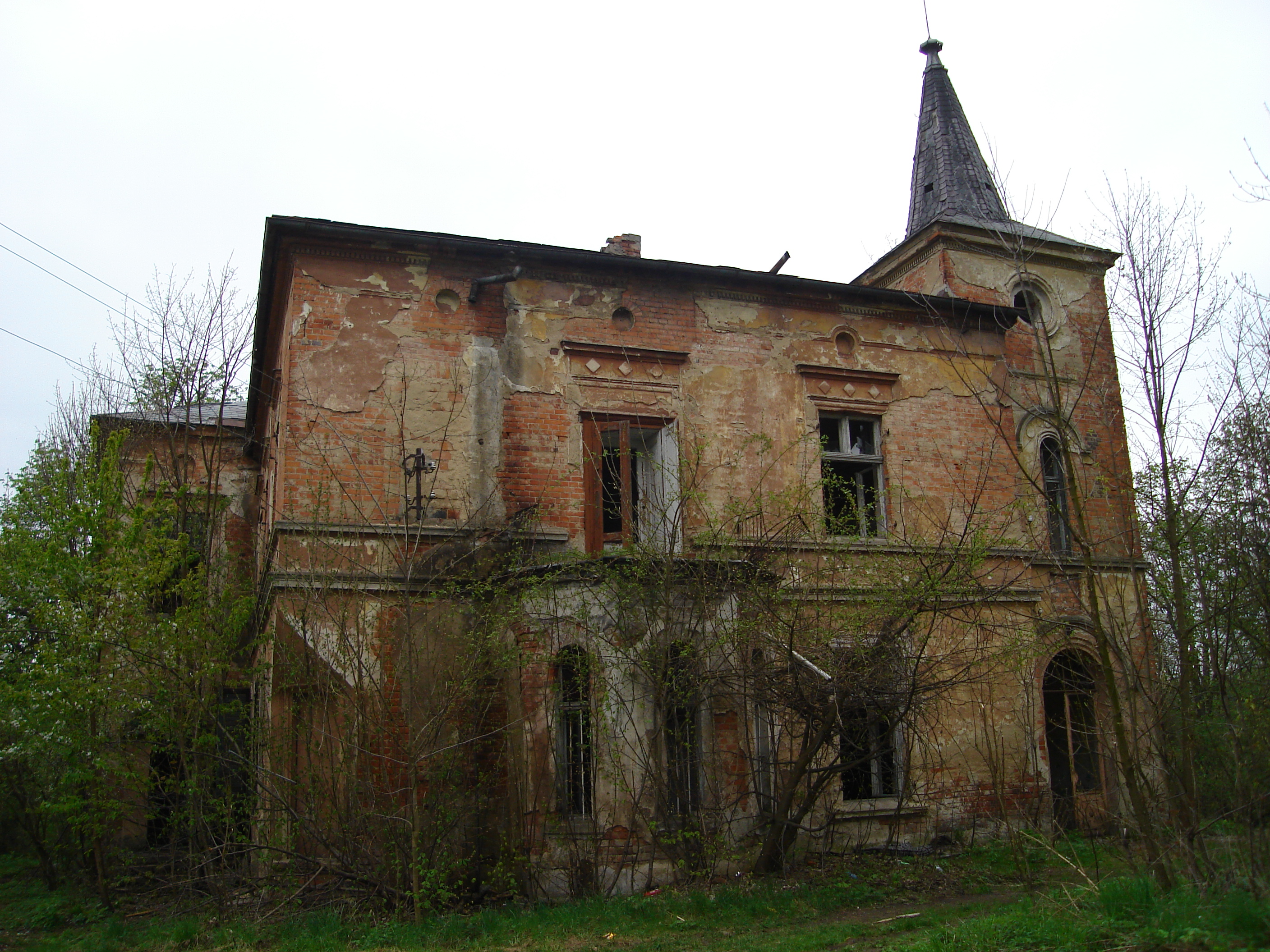
- Palace

- Location within Poland
- Coordinates: 51°16′42″N 17°05′18″E
- Country: Poland
- Voivodeship: Lower Silesian
- County: Trzebnica
- Gmina: Trzebnica

Brochocin [brɔˈxɔt͡ɕin] is a village in the administrative district of Gmina Trzebnica, within Trzebnica County, Lower Silesian Voivodeship, in south-western Poland.
