= Skoroszów =

Skoroszów may refer to the following places in Poland:

- Skoroszów, Lower Silesian Voivodeship (south-west Poland)
- Skoroszów, Greater Poland Voivodeship (west-central Poland)
