= Boleścin, Trzebnica County =

Boleścin
- Village
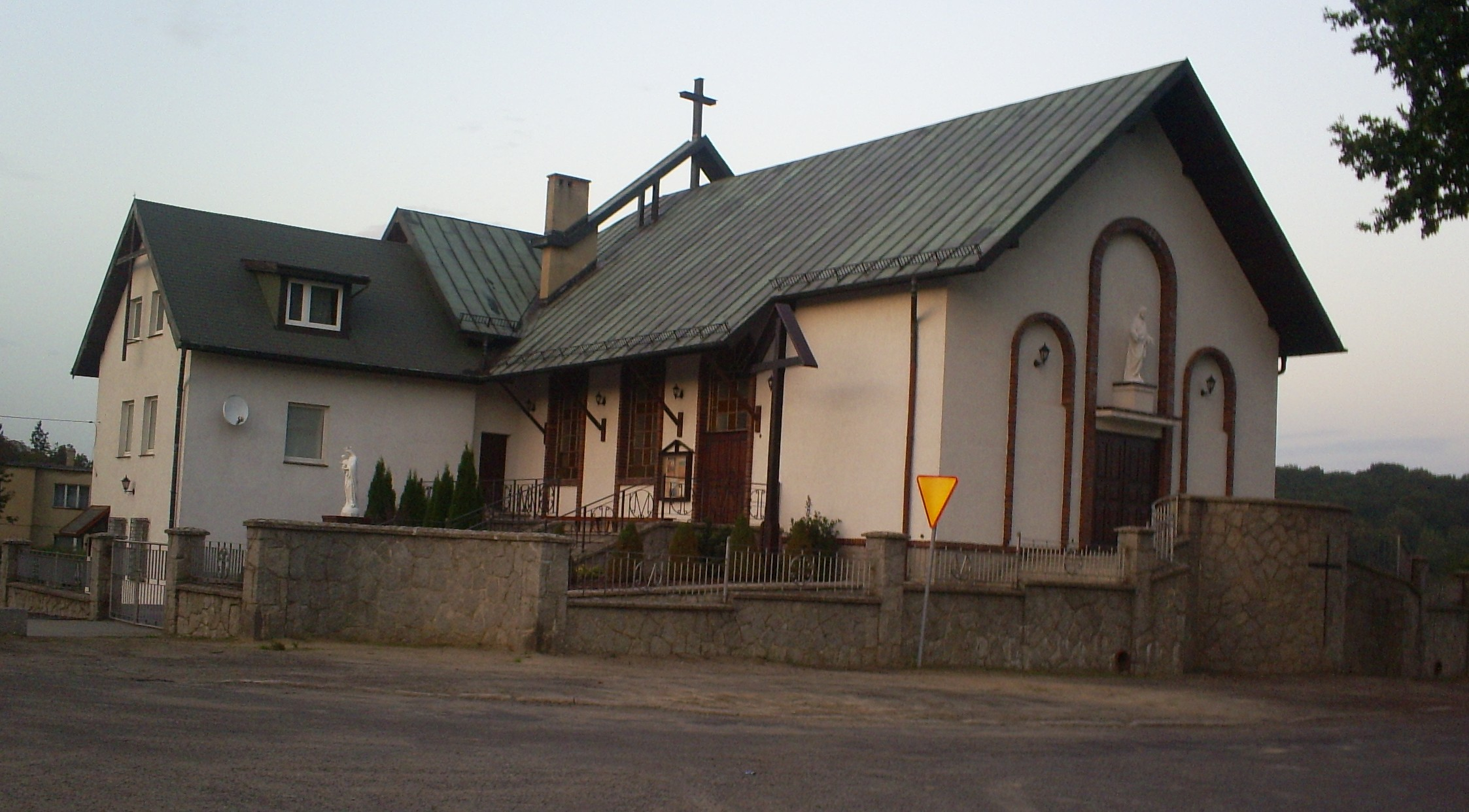

- Location within Poland
- Coordinates: 51°15′55″N 17°09′48″E
- Country: Poland
- Voivodeship: Lower Silesian
- County: Trzebnica
- Gmina: Trzebnica

Boleścin [bɔˈlɛɕt͡ɕin] is a village in the administrative district of Gmina Trzebnica, within Trzebnica County, Lower Silesian Voivodeship, in south-western Poland.
