= Piersno =

Piersno may refer to the following places in Poland:

- Piersno, Gmina Kostomłoty, Środa County in Lower Silesian Voivodeship (SW Poland)
- Piersno, Trzebnica County (in Gmina Trzebnica), Lower Silesian Voivodeship (SW Poland)
