= Skarszyn =

Skarszyn may refer to the following places in Poland:

- Skarszyn, Lower Silesian Voivodeship (south-west Poland)
- Skarszyn, Masovian Voivodeship (east-central Poland)
