= Rzędziszowice =

- Village
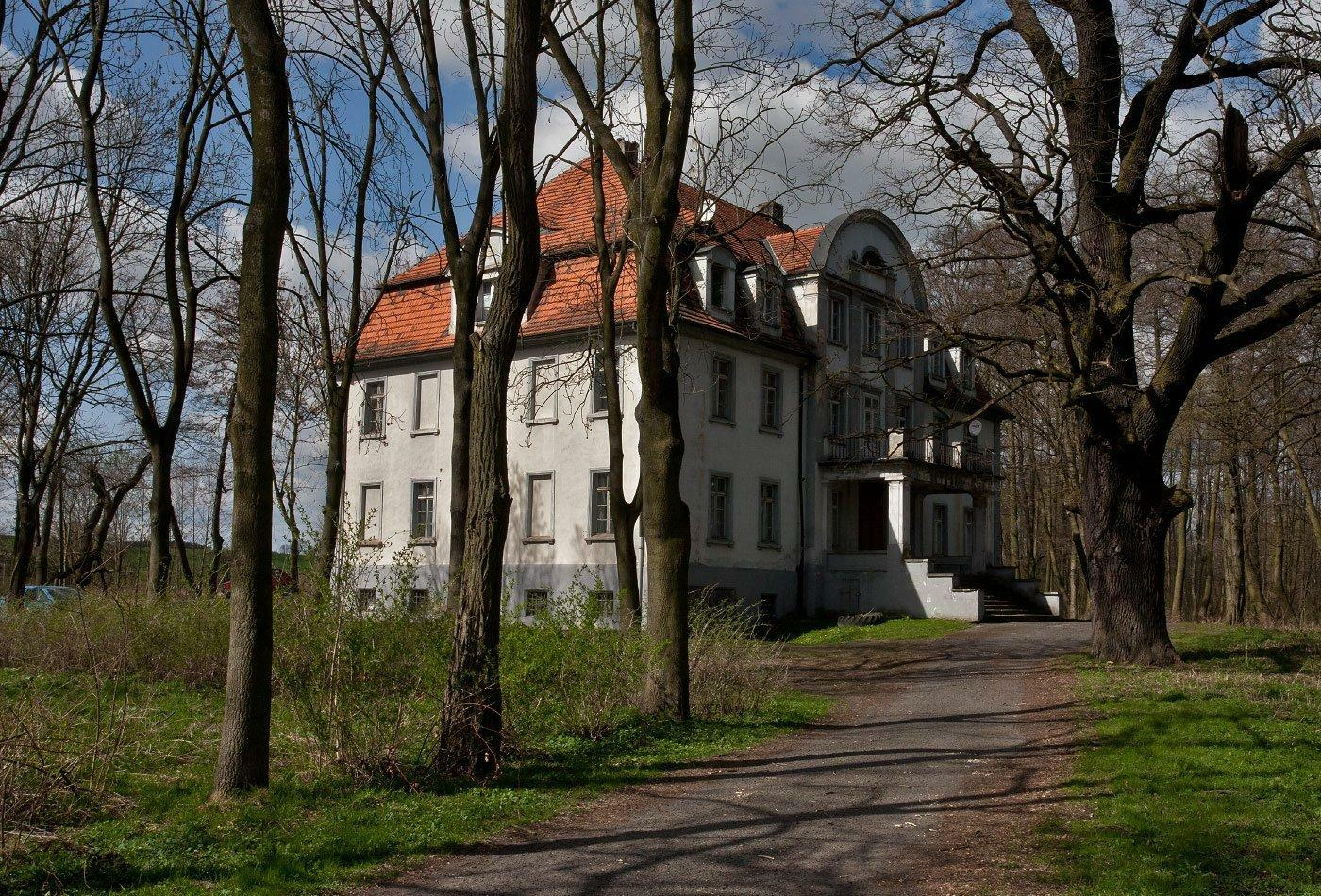
- Palace

- Location within Poland
- Coordinates: 51°16′56″N 17°14′12″E
- Country: Poland
- Voivodeship: Lower Silesian
- County: Trzebnica
- Gmina: Zawonia

Rzędziszowice [ʐɛnd͡ʑiʂɔˈvit͡sɛ] is a village in the administrative district of Gmina Zawonia, within Trzebnica County, Lower Silesian Voivodeship, in south-western Poland.
