= Niedary, Lower Silesian Voivodeship =

Niedary
- Village
- Location within Poland
- Coordinates: 51°19′00″N 17°14′15″E
- Country: Poland
- Voivodeship: Lower Silesian
- County: Trzebnica
- Gmina: Zawonia

Niedary [ɲɛˈdarɨ] is a small village in the administrative district of Gmina Zawonia, within Trzebnica County, Lower Silesian Voivodeship, in south-western Poland.
