= Księginice, Trzebnica County =

Księginice
- Village
- Location within Poland
- Coordinates: 51°19′56″N 17°04′51″E
- Country: Poland
- Voivodeship: Lower Silesian
- County: Trzebnica
- Gmina: Trzebnica

Księginice (Polish pronunciation: [kɕɛŋɡʲiˈɲit͡sɛ]) is a village in the administrative district of Gmina Trzebnica, within Trzebnica County, Lower Silesian Voivodeship, in south-western Poland.
