= Grochowa, Trzebnica County =

Grochowa
- Village
- Location within Poland
- Coordinates: 51°20′24″N 17°12′46″E
- Country: Poland
- Voivodeship: Lower Silesian
- County: Trzebnica
- Gmina: Zawonia

Grochowa [ɡrɔˈxɔva] is a village in the administrative district of Gmina Zawonia, within Trzebnica County, Lower Silesian Voivodeship, in south-western Poland.
