= Nowy Dwór, Trzebnica County =

Nowy Dwór
- Village
- Location within Poland
- Coordinates: 51°19′25″N 17°03′34″E
- Country: Poland
- Voivodeship: Lower Silesian
- County: Trzebnica
- Gmina: Trzebnica

Nowy Dwór [ˈnɔvɨ ˈdvur] is a village in the administrative district of Gmina Trzebnica, within Trzebnica County, Lower Silesian Voivodeship, in south-western Poland.
