= Brzezie, Lower Silesian Voivodeship =

Brzezie
- Village
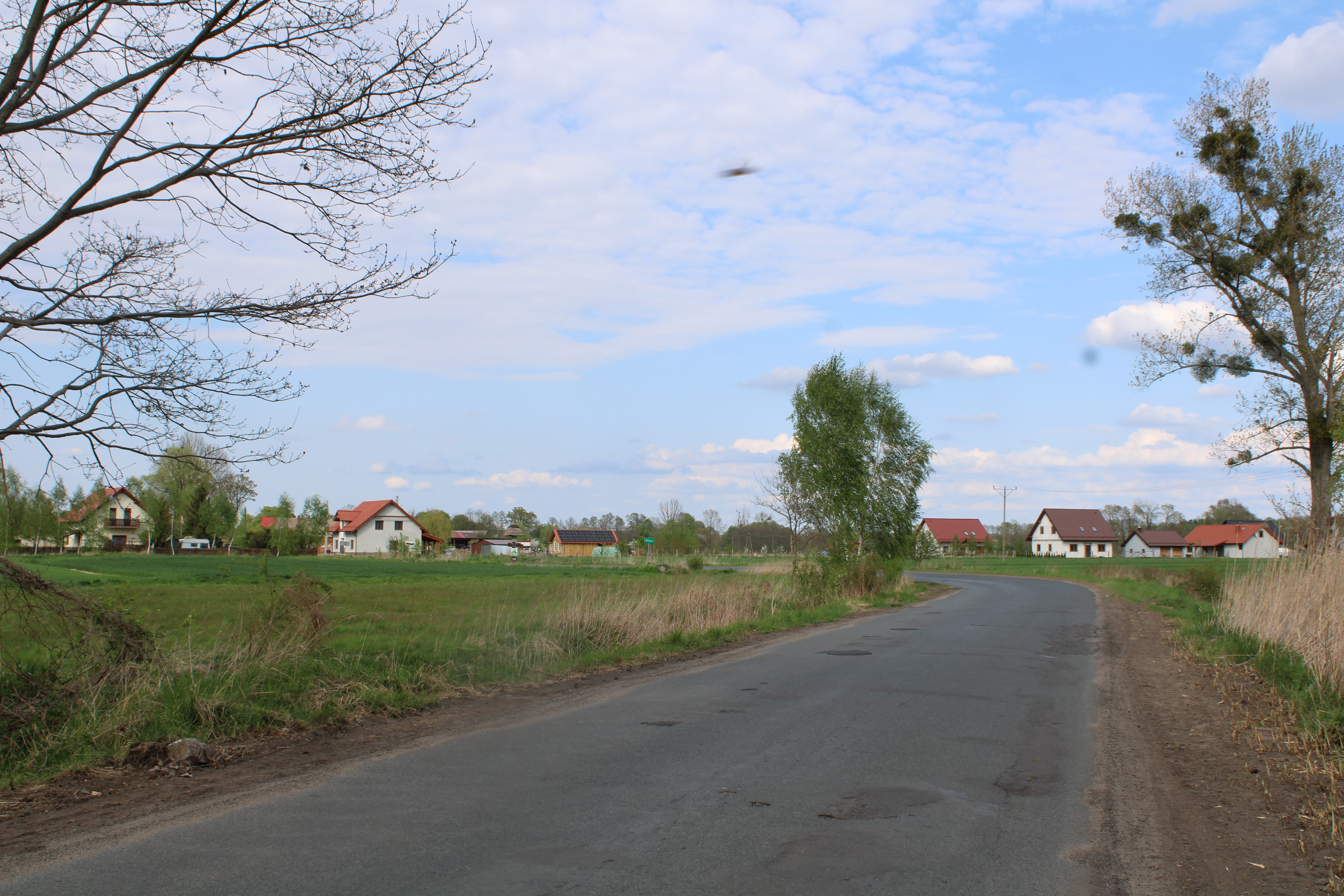

- Location within Poland
- Coordinates: 51°24′46″N 17°9′0″E
- Country: Poland
- Voivodeship: Lower Silesian
- County: Trzebnica
- Gmina: Trzebnica

Brzezie [ˈbʐɛʑɛ] is a village in the administrative district of Gmina Trzebnica, within Trzebnica County, Lower Silesian Voivodeship, in south-western Poland.
