= Komorówko, Lower Silesian Voivodeship =

Komorówko
- Village
- Location within Poland
- Coordinates: 51°22′56″N 17°04′48″E
- Country: Poland
- Voivodeship: Lower Silesian
- County: Trzebnica
- Gmina: Trzebnica

Komorówko [kɔmɔˈrufkɔ] is a village in the administrative district of Gmina Trzebnica, within Trzebnica County, Lower Silesian Voivodeship, in south-western Poland.
