= Koczurki =

- Village
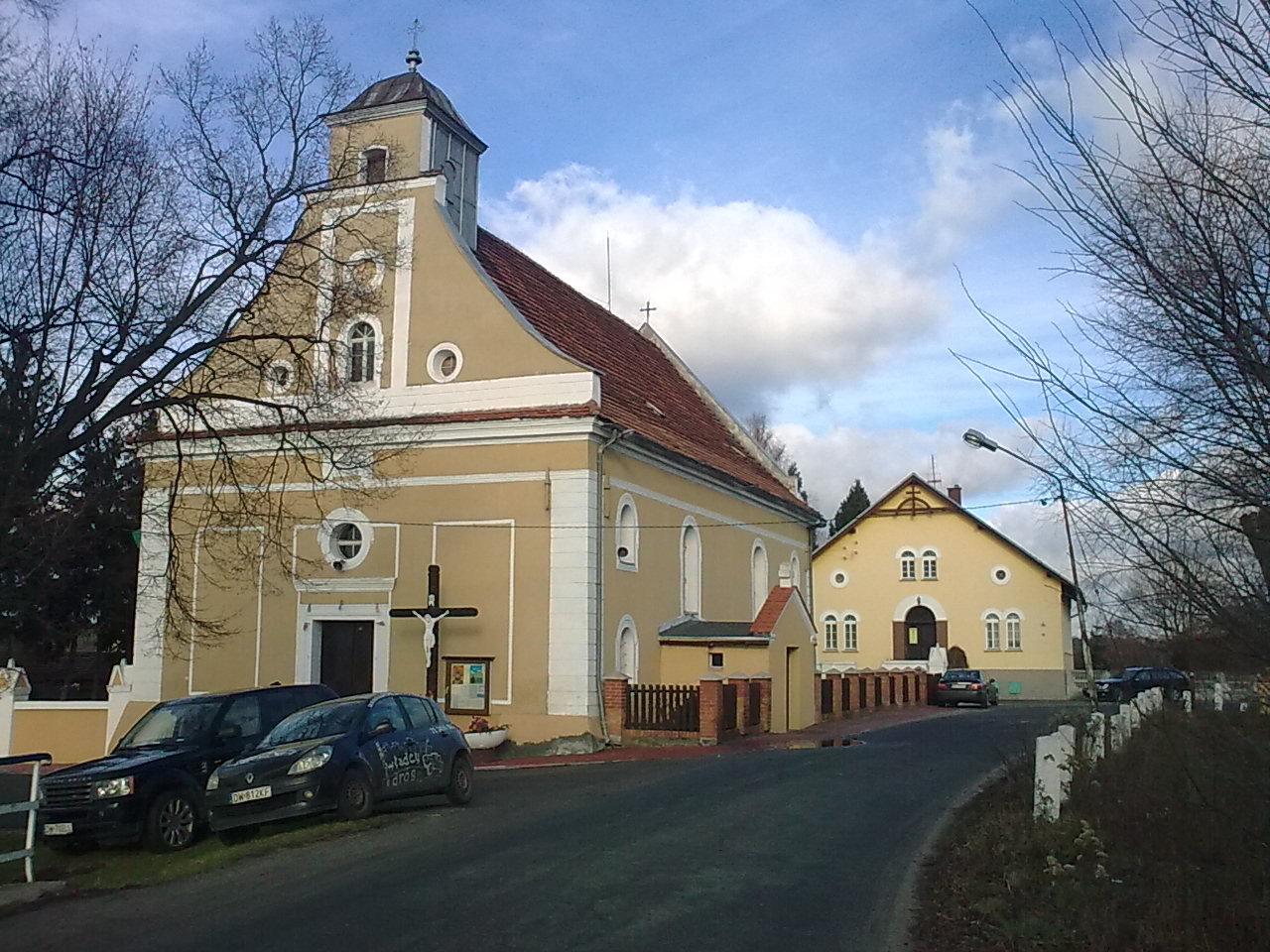
- Catholic church

- Location within Poland
- Coordinates: 51°23′21″N 17°06′41″E
- Country: Poland
- Voivodeship: Lower Silesian
- County: Trzebnica
- Gmina: Trzebnica

Koczurki [kɔˈt͡ʂurkʲi] is a village in the administrative district of Gmina Trzebnica, within Trzebnica County, Lower Silesian Voivodeship, in south-western Poland.
