= Biedaszków Wielki =

- Village
- Location within Poland
- Coordinates: 51°23′57″N 17°08′48″E
- Country: Poland
- Voivodeship: Lower Silesian
- County: Trzebnica
- Gmina: Trzebnica

Biedaszków Wielki (Polish pronunciation: [bjɛˈdaʂkuv ˈvjɛlkʲi]) is a village in the administrative district of Gmina Trzebnica, within Trzebnica County, Lower Silesian Voivodeship, in south-western Poland.
