= Głuchów Górny =

- Village
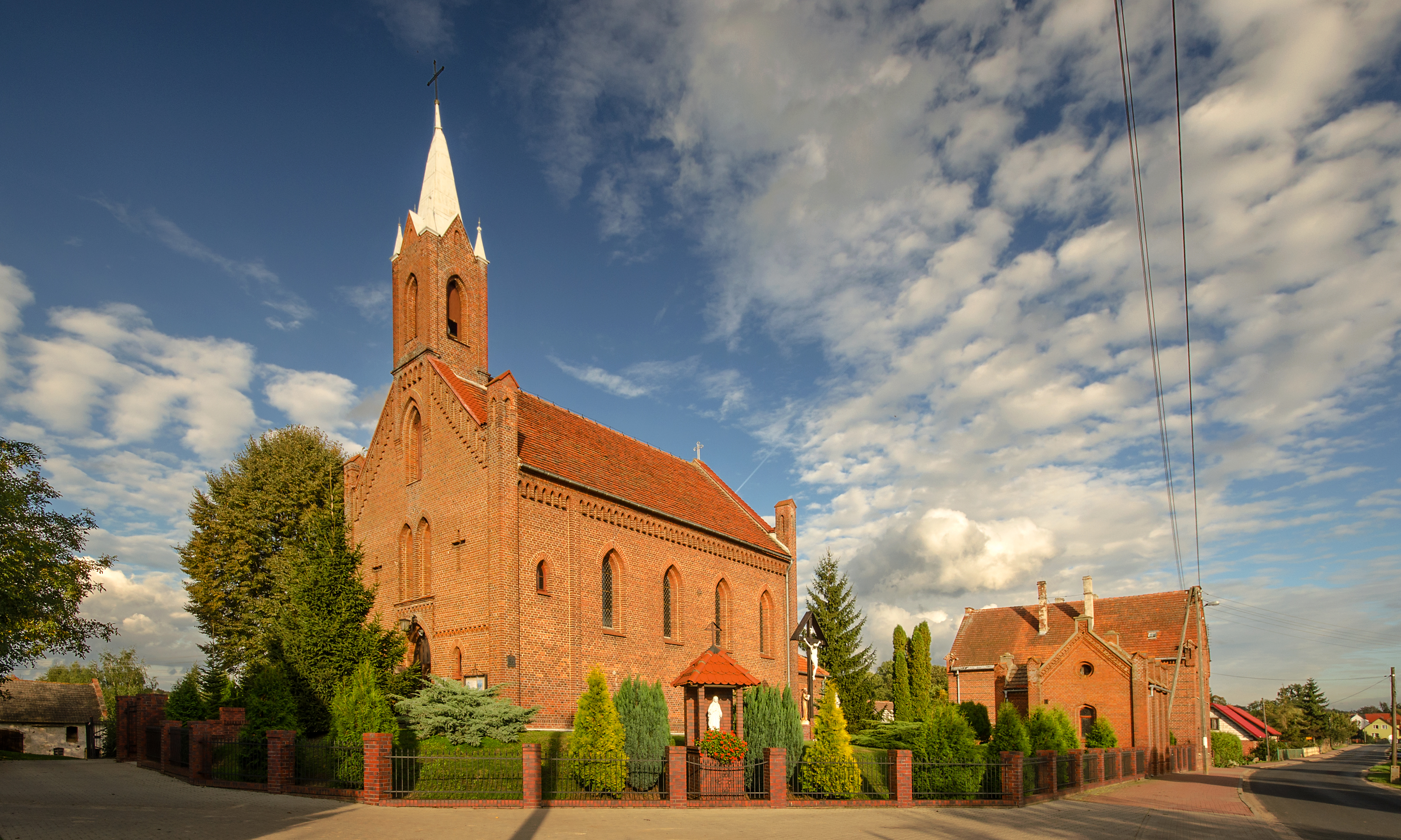
- Catholic church

- Location within Poland
- Coordinates: 51°16′15″N 17°07′48″E
- Country: Poland
- Voivodeship: Lower Silesian
- County: Trzebnica
- Gmina: Trzebnica
- Population: 210

Głuchów Górny [ˈɡwuxuf ˈɡurnɨ] is a village in the administrative district of Gmina Trzebnica, within Trzebnica County, Lower Silesian Voivodeship, in south-western Poland.
