= Budczyce =

- Village
- Location within Poland
- Coordinates: 51°20′1″N 17°11′0″E
- Country: Poland
- Voivodeship: Lower Silesian
- County: Trzebnica
- Gmina: Zawonia

Budczyce [butˈt͡ʂɨt͡sɛ] is a village in the administrative district of Gmina Zawonia in Trzebnica County, Lower Silesian Voivodeship in southwestern Poland.
