= Bukowiec, Trzebnica County =

Bukowiec
- Village
- Location within Poland
- Coordinates: 51°20′57″N 17°08′58″E
- Country: Poland
- Voivodeship: Lower Silesian
- County: Trzebnica
- Gmina: Trzebnica

Bukowiec [buˈkɔvjɛt͡s] is a village in the administrative district of Gmina Trzebnica, within Trzebnica County, Lower Silesian Voivodeship, in south-western Poland.
