= Komorowo, Lower Silesian Voivodeship =

Komorowo
- Village
- Location within Poland
- Coordinates: 51°22′11″N 17°05′21″E
- Country: Poland
- Voivodeship: Lower Silesian
- County: Trzebnica
- Gmina: Trzebnica
- Time zone: UTC+1 (CET)
  - Summer (DST): UTC+2 (CEST)
- Vehicle registration: DTR

Komorowo [kɔmɔˈrɔvɔ] is a village in the administrative district of Gmina Trzebnica, within Trzebnica County, Lower Silesian Voivodeship, in south-western Poland.

Komorowo was once divided into two villages: Wielkie Komorowo and Małe Komorowo.
