= Kałowice =

- Village
- Location within Poland
- Coordinates: 51°20′07″N 17°08′44″E
- Country: Poland
- Voivodeship: Lower Silesian
- County: Trzebnica
- Gmina: Zawonia

Kałowice [kawɔˈvit͡sɛ] is a village in the administrative district of Gmina Zawonia, within Trzebnica County, Lower Silesian Voivodeship, in south-western Poland.

== Name controversy ==
The village's name has attracted controversy and harassment towards students from the municipality, as the Polish word kał can be translated to "feces". Due to this, in June of 2025, a referendum on changing the name to Przylesie was planned to take place.

68 people voted in the referendum. With 34 votes against the change and 32 in favour, the name Kałowice was kept.
