= Ujeździec Wielki =

- Village
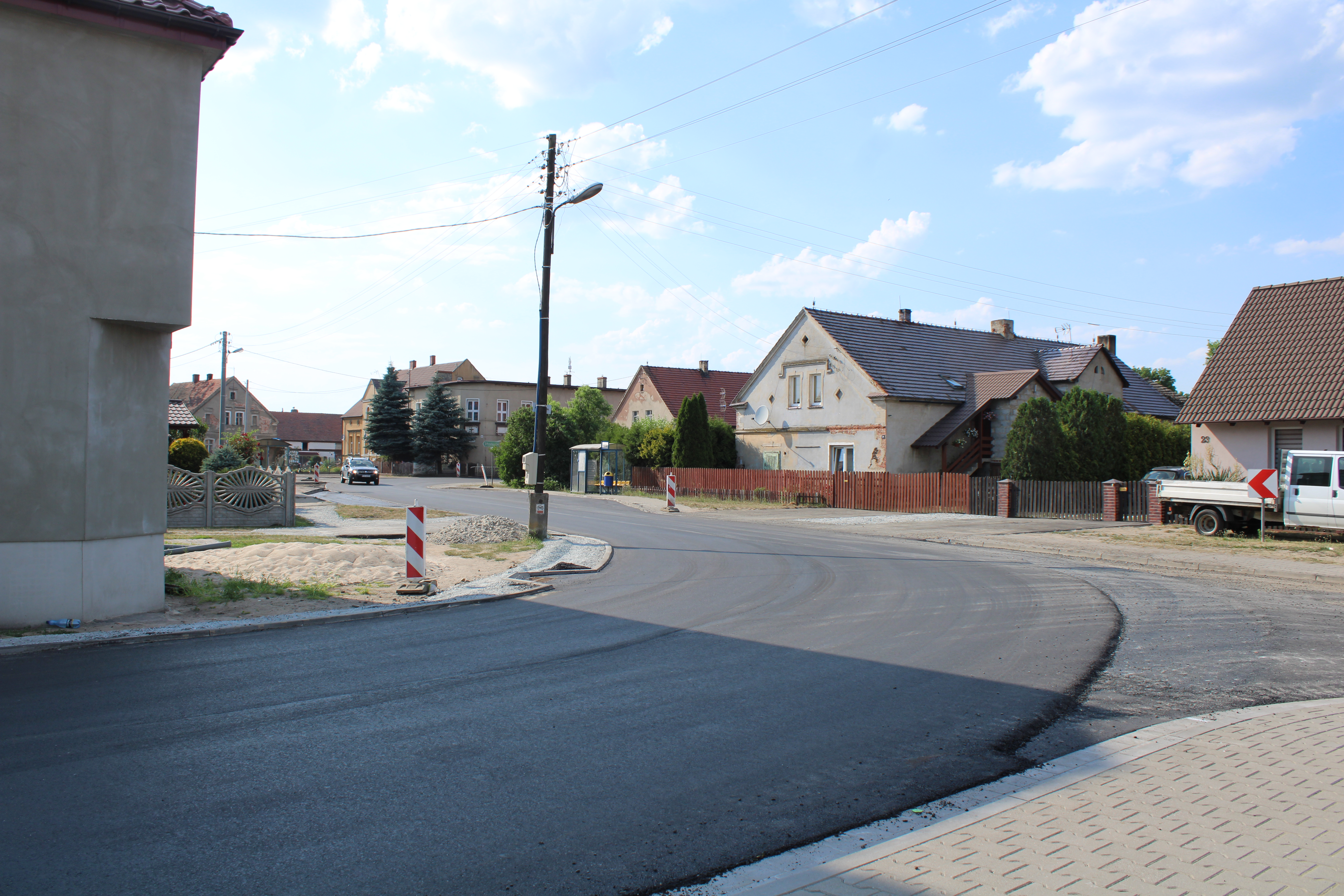

- Location within Poland
- Coordinates: 51°24′57″N 17°05′41″E
- Country: Poland
- Voivodeship: Lower Silesian
- County: Trzebnica
- Gmina: Trzebnica

Ujeździec Wielki (Polish pronunciation: [uˈjɛʑdʑɛts ˈfjɛlkʲi]) is a village in the administrative district of Gmina Trzebnica, within Trzebnica County, Lower Silesian Voivodeship, in south-western Poland.
