= Marcinowo, Lower Silesian Voivodeship =

Marcinowo
- Village
- Location within Poland
- Coordinates: 51°19′N 17°2′E
- Country: Poland
- Voivodeship: Lower Silesian
- County: Trzebnica
- Gmina: Trzebnica

Marcinowo [mart͡ɕiˈnɔvɔ] is a village in the administrative district of Gmina Trzebnica, within Trzebnica County, Lower Silesian Voivodeship, in south-western Poland.
