= Trzęsowice =

- Village
- Location within Poland
- Coordinates: 51°21′52″N 17°15′35″E
- Country: Poland
- Voivodeship: Lower Silesian
- County: Trzebnica
- Gmina: Zawonia

Trzęsowice [tʂɛ̃sɔˈvit͡sɛ] is a village in the administrative district of Gmina Zawonia, within Trzebnica County, Lower Silesian Voivodeship, in south-western Poland.

== Administrative division ==
In the years 1975–1998 the town administratively belonged to the Wrocław voivodeship.
