= Ewelina Lisowska =

Polish singer-songwriter

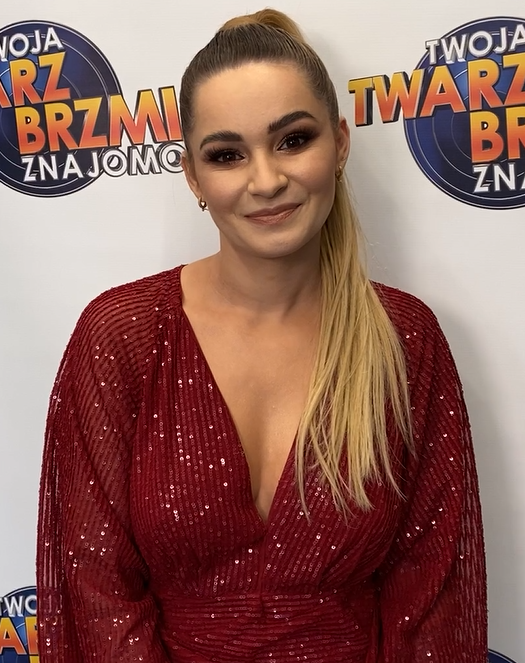
- Ewelina Lisowska (2020)

Background information
- Also known as: Evelynn
- Born: Ewelina Monika Lisowska; 23 August 1991 (age 35); Wrocław, Poland
- Origin: Cerekwica, Poland
- Genres: Pop; Pop rock; electropop; reggaeton; pop-rap
- Occupations: Singer; vocal producer; actress; songwriter; dancer
- Instruments: Vocals; classical guitar
- Years active: 2003–present
- Labels: HQT Music Group; Universal Music Group; Warner Music Poland

Ewelina Monika Lisowska (Polish pronunciation: [ɛvɛˈlina liˈsɔfska]; born 23 August 1991) is a Polish singer, songwriter and vocal producer.

She has released four solo studio albums: Aero-Plan (2013), Nowe Horyzonty (2014), Ponad Wszystko (2016) and Cztery (2018). Two of them reached the top of the list of the most-bought albums in Poland. She received two gold records for the sale of her albums.

She is the winner of many music awards, such as Eska Music Awards in the categories of Best Hit ("W stronę słońca"), Best Debut and Best Online Artist, 51st KFPP in Opole, Onet Super Premiere ("We mgle") or SuperJedynki. She also won many nominations, including for MTV Europe Music Awards 2013, TOPtrendy 2014 and Polsat Sopot Festival.

She has been a participant or guest in several entertainment programs. She won Dancing with the Stars, and won third place on Your Face Sounds Familiar. She lent her voice to the leading characters in the animated films Justin and the Knights of Valour and Charming. Video materials on the official channels of Ewelina Lisowska on YouTube have over 151 million views. Since November 2018, she has been publishing materials in the TikTok application, where she is watched by almost 500,000. users, and collected a total of 6.5 million likes under the recordings.

== Biography ==
Born in Cerekwica, Lower Silesian Voivodeship, Lisowska is a graduate of the Grażyna Bacewicz First Stage School of Music in Wrocław, in classical guitar. Since then, she was the lead singer of the post hardcore band "Nurth" with the stage name Evelynn Nurth. In addition to melodious singing she also uses growl. In 2011, she participated in the talent show TVN's Mam Talent (Got Talent). In 2012, Lisowska recorded an international single "Communications Are Down" with a metalcore band from Texas/New York called Forever in Promise. A few months later, she reached the semi-finals of the Polish adaptation of the second X Factor format, including on-air broadcast television station TVN. As a result, Lisowska signed a contract with music label HQT Music Group. Her debut EP, "Ewelina Lisowska" was released on 7 August 2012. The material was promoted by song "Nieodporny Rozum" (Fragile Mind) which has been carried out in the music video directed by Dariusz Szermanowicz. Her recent album " Aero-Plan"was released 7 May 2013. The music video for "Jutra nie będzie" (There Will Be No Tomorrow) was released on YouTube on 26 April 2013. It is the third single of Aero-Plan.

In 2016, she was a guest on the Hell's Kitchen show. At the end of July 2016, she released the single "Prosta Sprawa". The song announced the next studio album entitled Ponad Wszystko, which was released on 4 November 2016. The other singles promoting the album were the songs: „Zatrzymaj się", „Zrób to!” and „Niebo/Piekło”.

On 14 February, she released the single I'm Franky to which she sang the opening credits. On 5 June 2017, she presented the music video for the song „W sercu miasta". On 31 December 2017, she performed on stage during the New Year's Eve party of TVN in Warsaw, where she sang the hits "Nieodporny rozum" and "W stronę słońca" and covered "Beautiful People", originally sung by Sia and Rihanna, and "Chained to the Rhythm" by Katy Perry. On 25 May 2018, she released a video for the song "T-shirt", which – along with "W sercu miasta" – was on her album entitled Cztery, which premiered on 22 June 2018. In addition, she lent her voice to Cinderella in the animated film Charming. On 31 December, she performed at Stadion Śląski in Chorzów during the New Year's Eve with Polsat, performed Lady Gaga's song "Bad Romance" and her hit "Prosta Sprawa". Then she played a New Year's Eve concert with a band in Częstochowa.

On 26 April 2019, she made a guest appearance in the eighth episode of the ninth edition of Dancing with the Stars, singing the song "Shallow" in a duet with Danzel. On 13 May, together with her sisters, she appeared on Dzień Dobry TVN. On 2 June, she gave a concert in Lubartów, organized on the occasion of Children's Day by the Polsat Foundation. On 6 June, she performed in Opole at the concert "Don't ask about Poland" broadcast by TVP2. On 14 August, she performed in Sopot at the Top of The Top Sopot Festival concert broadcast by TVN. On 20 September, she appeared as a musical guest during the Big Brother program, which was broadcast by TVN 7, performing the song "We will defeat the storm". In addition, she took third place in the final of the twelfth edition of the program Your face sounds familiar, previously winning two episodes program, in which she played Justyna Steczkowska and Edyta Górniak. On 31 December 2019, she appeared on New Year's Eve in Warsaw, which was broadcast on TVN, she performed her hits.

In the spring of 2020, she hosted in one of the episodes of TVP1 This was the year!, in which she sang the hit Nancy Sinatra "These Boots Are Made For Walkin". On 16 May, she published a film as part of the Hot16Challenge campaign, for which she was nominated by Damian Ukeje, the artist entitled her 16-line song „Wodospady". On September 5, she performed in Opole at the 57th National Festival of Polish Song, performing a song from Danuta Rinn's repertoire "Where are these men". On October 2, the premiere of the single and the music video „Nie mogę zapomnieć" took place, it is the first single released independently, apart from Universal Music Polska. On 4 October, she left Bielsko-Biała in Pytanie na śniadanie, telling about her private life and musical plans. On 30 October, together with Riot Games, she released a single, which is a Polish adaptation of the latest MORE soundtrack related to League of Legends. On 31 October, she visited the Dzień Dobry TVN studio where she presented her latest single „Nie mogę zapomnieć" and in an interview with Marcin Prokop she told about her future musical plans. On 31 October she appeared as a guest musician during the program America da lubić, which was broadcast by TVP2 station, performing the song "Redneck Woman." On 18 December, she made a guest appearance in Kaen's song „Kwarantanna", for which a music video was recorded. On 18 December, a Christmas charity episode of the program Your face sounds familiar was broadcast, in which Lisowska sang the song „Pada śnieg" in a duet with Krzysztof Antkowiak. On 15 December, she performed at the "Christmas Tale" concert in the Castle Chapel on the Castle Hill in Lubin.

At the end of January 2021, for a few days, together with Filip Chajzer, she ran the Allegro program for the Great Orchestra of Christmas Charity, and herself put up a concert on board a helicopter. On 7 August, Lisowska performed at the concert Wakacyjne hity wszech czasów, which was broadcast by TVP2, performing her song „W stronę słońca”. In September, the program Fort Boyard was broadcast on the Viaplay platform, in which the singer took part. The artist announced that next year she plans to release the fifth studio album on the occasion of the jubilee of ten years of presence on the Polish music scene. In the fall of 2021 she joined the Hockey Team of the Polish Artists Representation. On November 18, there was, among others, with the song "Nie ufaj" during the opening at Hala Koszyki in Warsaw. On 31 December, Lisowska performed at the Polish concert Sylwester Szczęścia at the Silesian Stadium, where she sang, in turn, "All Around The World", „W Stronę Słońca", "Freed from Desire" and together with Danzel she performed the song "Shallow".

On 14 January 2022, together with Kubańczyk and Ola Ciupa, she released the „Wartości" soundtrack with a music video promoting the latest film by Patryk Vega. On January 30, she performed at a community center in Bielsk Podlaski during the 30th Final of the Great Orchestra of Christmas Charity. On February 1, she appeared at the premiere of the movie "Love, Sex and Pandemic" by Patryk Vega, for which she recorded a song, which she presented on February 5, together with the Kubańczyk, to viewers of the program Dzień Dobry TVN. On May 27, Lisowska performed the final gala of Miss Polonia, the finale of which was broadcast on TVP2.

== Nurth ==
Nurth was founded in 2007 by Maciek "Jonson" Wiergowski. Lisowska fronted the band under the stage name of Evelynn Nurth. In 2009, they released their first EP entitled "Revolution."In 2010, they released their first single entitled "The Last Second Of Life" which first showcased Lisowska's screaming technique. The cover of the single showed a new Nurth logo in red letters with a dark background. They released their second EP entitled "Stay Away" in 2011. The art shows a purple background with same Nurth logo in pink letters. The main piece of art shows what looks like a keyhole with a little girl following an owl on the other side. The last known song associated with the band is "Communications Are Down" by Forever in Promise which featured Lisowska under her stage name Evelynn Nurth in 2012.No other songs were released or associated with the band since.

== Discography ==
=== Studio albums ===
Title	Album details	Peak chart positions	Sales	Certifications
Title	Album details	POL	Sales	Certifications
Aero-Plan	Released: 7 May 2013; Label: HQT Music Group; Formats: CD, digital download	10	POL: 15,000+	POL: Gold
Nowe horyzonty	Released: 28 October 2014; Label: Universal Music Group; Formats: CD, digital download	21	POL: 15,000+	POL: Gold
Ponad wszystko	Released: 4 November 2016; Label: Universal Music Group; Formats: CD, digital download	44		
Cztery	Released: 22 June 2018; Label: Universal Music Group; Formats: CD, digital download	—		
"—" denotes a recording that did not chart or was not released in that territory.

=== Extended plays ===
Title	EP details
Ewelina Lisowska	Released: 7 August 2012; Label: HQT Music Group; Formats: CD, digital download

=== Singles ===
Title	Year	Peak chart positions	Album
Title	Year	POL	Album
"Nieodporny rozum"	2012	1	Ewelina Lisowska / Aero-Plan
"W stronę słońca"	2012	1	Aero-Plan
"Jutra nie będzie"	2013	—	Aero-Plan
"We mgle"	2014	—	Nowe horyzonty
"Na obcy ląd"	2014	18	Nowe horyzonty
"Nowe horyzonty"	2014	—	Nowe horyzonty
"Zatrzymaj się"	2015	20	Ponad wszystko
"Prosta sprawa"	2016	10	Ponad wszystko
"Zrób to!"	2016	—	Ponad wszystko
„Niebo / Piekło (Jaro Remix)”	2017	—	Ponad wszystko
„W sercu miasta"	2017	—	Cztery
„T-shirt"	2018	21	Cztery
„Tylko mój" (with Marta Gałuszewska, Honorata Skarbek)	2018	—	Charming (soundtrack)
„Nie mogę zapomnieć"	2020	—	yet unknown
„More"	2020	—	League of Legends (soundtrack)
„Kwarantanna" (with Kaen)	2020	—	Jason
„Wartości" (feat. Kubańczyk i DJ Slavic)	2022	—	Miłość, seks & pandemia (soundtrack)
"—" denotes a recording that did not chart or was not released in that territory.

=== Cover song ===
- #icanteven by The Neighbourhood
- Leaving Tonight by The Neighbourhood
- Angel With a Shotgun by The Cab
- Mama Told Me by Cash Cash
- Take Me Home by Cash Cash ft. Bebe Rexha
- Demons by Imagine Dragons
- Pumped Up Kicks by Foster The People
- It's Time by Imagine Dragons
- Radioactive by Imagine Dragons
- Light It Up by Major Lazer
- Get Free by Major Lazer
- Faded by Alan Walker
- Side to Side by Ariana Grande feat. Nicki Minaj
- Human by Christina Perri
- Big Girls Cry by Sia
- Angel by the Wings by Sia
- Elastic Heart by Sia
- Move Your Body by Sia
- Tuesday by Burak Yeter feat. Danelle Sandoval

== Dancing with the Stars. Taniec z gwiazdami performances ==
Week #	Dance / Song	Judges' score				Result
Week #	Dance / Song	Grabowski	Pavlović	Tyszkiewicz	Malitowski	Result
1	Jive / "Thank You Very Much"	9	8	9	7	Safe
2	Jazz / "Wrecking Ball"	9	10	10	9	Safe
3	Salsa / "La Vida Es Un Carnaval"	10	10	10	10	Safe
4	Foxtrot / "Hello"	10	10	10	9	Safe
5	Cha-cha-cha / "Na pewno"	10	9	10	9	Safe
6	Viennese Waltz / "Usta milczą, dusza śpiewa" Team Freestyle / "How Deep Is Your Love"	10; 9	8; 10	9; 9	7; 8	Safe
7	Samba / "Fireball"	10	10	10	10	Safe (Immunity)
8	Contemporary / "Another Love"; Freestyle / "I'd Do Anything for Love (But I Won't Do That)"	10; 10	10; 10	10; 10	10; 10	Safe
9	Cha-cha-cha / "Ktoś nowy" Rumba / "Light My Fire"	10; 10	10; 10	9; 10	8; 9	Safe
10	Tango / "Por Una Cabeza"; Freestyle / "Atmadja" and "Alegria"; Foxtrot / "Hello"	10; 10; 10	10; 10; 10	10; 10; 10	10; 10; 10	Winner
