= Blizocin =

Blizocin may refer to the following places in Poland:

- Blizocin, Lower Silesian Voivodeship (south-west Poland)
- Blizocin, Lublin Voivodeship (east Poland)
