= Jaszyce =

- Village
- Location within Poland
- Coordinates: 51°19′50″N 17°06′10″E
- Country: Poland
- Voivodeship: Lower Silesian
- County: Trzebnica
- Gmina: Trzebnica
- Population (approx.): 100

Jaszyce [jaˈʂɨt͡sɛ] is a village in the administrative district of Gmina Trzebnica, within Trzebnica County, Lower Silesian Voivodeship, in south-western Poland.
