= Czachowo =

Czachowo may refer to the following places in Poland:

- Czachowo, Lower Silesian Voivodeship (south-west Poland)
- Czachowo, Masovian Voivodeship (north-central Poland)
- Czachowo, West Pomeranian Voivodeship (north-west Poland)
