= Koniowo =

- Village
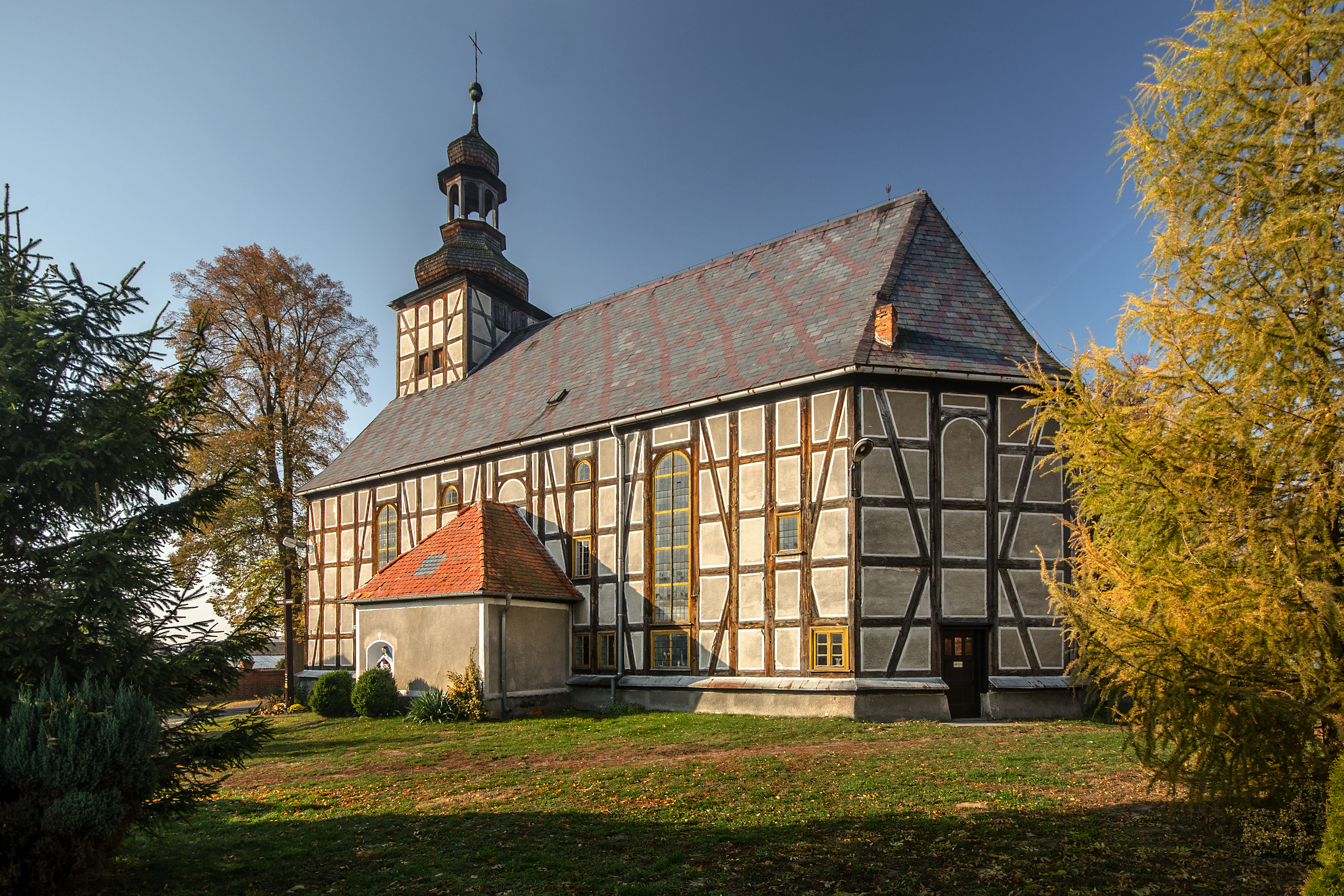
- Virgin Mary Queen of Poland church in Koniowo

- Location within Poland
- Coordinates: 51°25′54″N 17°04′20″E
- Country: Poland
- Voivodeship: Lower Silesian
- County: Trzebnica
- Gmina: Trzebnica
- Time zone: UTC+1 (CET)
  - Summer (DST): UTC+2 (CEST)
- Vehicle registration: DTR

Koniowo [kɔˈɲɔvɔ] is a village in the administrative district of Gmina Trzebnica, within Trzebnica County, Lower Silesian Voivodeship, in south-western Poland.

The name of the village is of Polish origin and comes from the word koń, which means "horse".
