= Skotniki, Lower Silesian Voivodeship =

Skotniki
- Village
- Location within Poland
- Coordinates: 51°17′12″N 17°09′35″E
- Country: Poland
- Voivodeship: Lower Silesian
- County: Trzebnica
- Gmina: Zawonia

Skotniki [skɔtˈniki] is a village in the administrative district of Gmina Zawonia, within Trzebnica County, Lower Silesian Voivodeship, in south-western Poland.
