= Kanice, Lower Silesian Voivodeship =

Kanice
- Village
- Location within Poland
- Coordinates: 51°22′27″N 17°07′23″E
- Country: Poland
- Voivodeship: Lower Silesian
- County: Trzebnica
- Gmina: Trzebnica

Kanice [kaˈɲit͡sɛ] is a village in the administrative district of Gmina Trzebnica, within Trzebnica County, Lower Silesian Voivodeship, in south-western Poland.
