= Sędzice, Lower Silesian Voivodeship =

Sędzice
- Village
- Location within Poland
- Coordinates: 51°18′31″N 17°08′43″E
- Country: Poland
- Voivodeship: Lower Silesian
- County: Trzebnica
- Gmina: Zawonia

Sędzice [sɛnˈd͡ʑit͡sɛ] is a village in the administrative district of Gmina Zawonia, within Trzebnica County, Lower Silesian Voivodeship, in south-western Poland.
