= Skoroszów, Lower Silesian Voivodeship =

Skoroszów
- Village
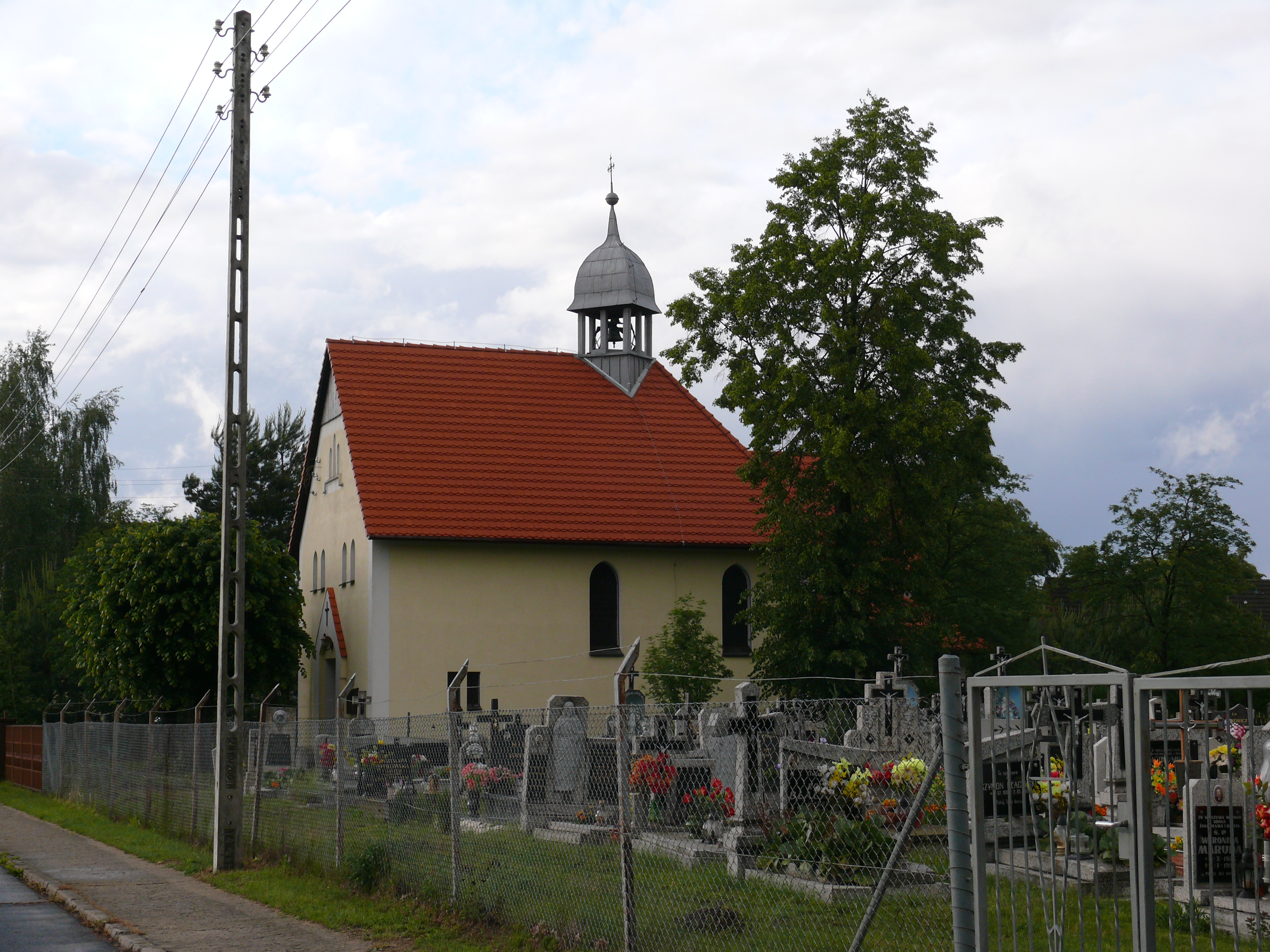
- Chapel

- Location within Poland
- Coordinates: 51°24′N 17°12′E
- Country: Poland
- Voivodeship: Lower Silesian
- County: Trzebnica
- Gmina: Trzebnica

Skoroszów [skɔˈrɔʂuf] is a village in the administrative district of Gmina Trzebnica, within Trzebnica County, Lower Silesian Voivodeship, in south-western Poland. Prior to 1945 it was in Prussian Silesia, named Katholisch Hammer.
