= Skarszyn, Lower Silesian Voivodeship =

Skarszyn
- Village
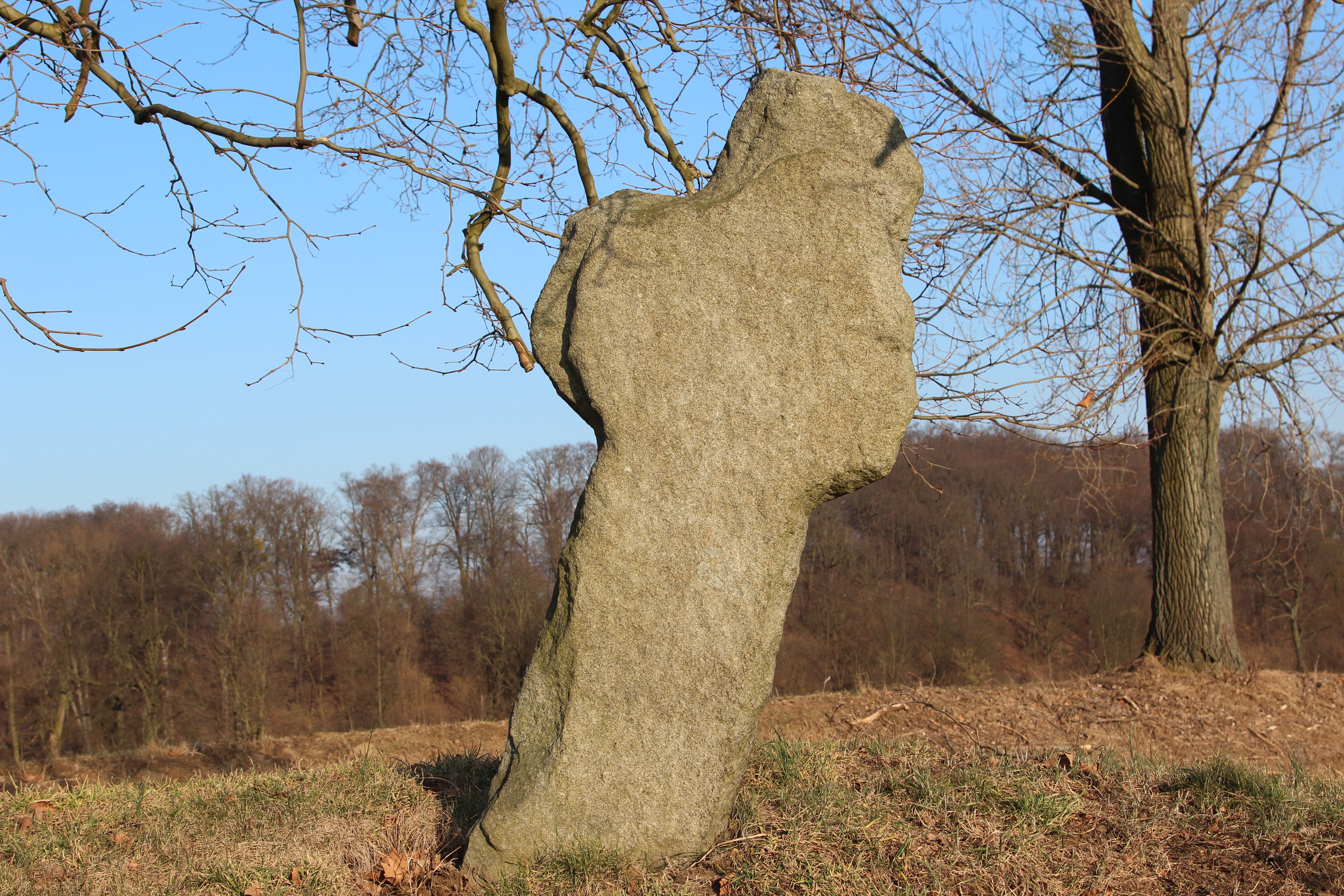
- Stone cross

- Location within Poland
- Coordinates: 51°15′15″N 17°09′36″E
- Country: Poland
- Voivodeship: Lower Silesian
- County: Trzebnica
- Gmina: Trzebnica
- Time zone: UTC+1 (CET)
  - Summer (DST): UTC+2 (CEST)
- Vehicle registration: DTR

Skarszyn [ˈskarʂɨn] is a village in the administrative district of Gmina Trzebnica, within Trzebnica County, Lower Silesian Voivodeship, in southwestern Poland.
