= Tarnowiec, Lower Silesian Voivodeship =

Tarnowiec
- Village
- Location within Poland
- Coordinates: 51°18′18″N 17°11′22″E
- Country: Poland
- Voivodeship: Lower Silesian
- County: Trzebnica
- Gmina: Zawonia

Tarnowiec [tarˈnɔvjɛt͡s] is a village in the administrative district of Gmina Zawonia, within Trzebnica County, Lower Silesian Voivodeship, in south-western Poland.
