= Blizocin, Lower Silesian Voivodeship =

Blizocin
- Village
- Location within Poland
- Coordinates: 51°22′4″N 17°9′35″E
- Country: Poland
- Voivodeship: Lower Silesian
- County: Trzebnica
- Gmina: Trzebnica

Blizocin [bliˈzɔt͡ɕin] is a village in the administrative district of Gmina Trzebnica, within Trzebnica County, Lower Silesian Voivodeship, in south-western Poland.
