= Cerekwica, Lower Silesian Voivodeship =

Cerekwica
- Village
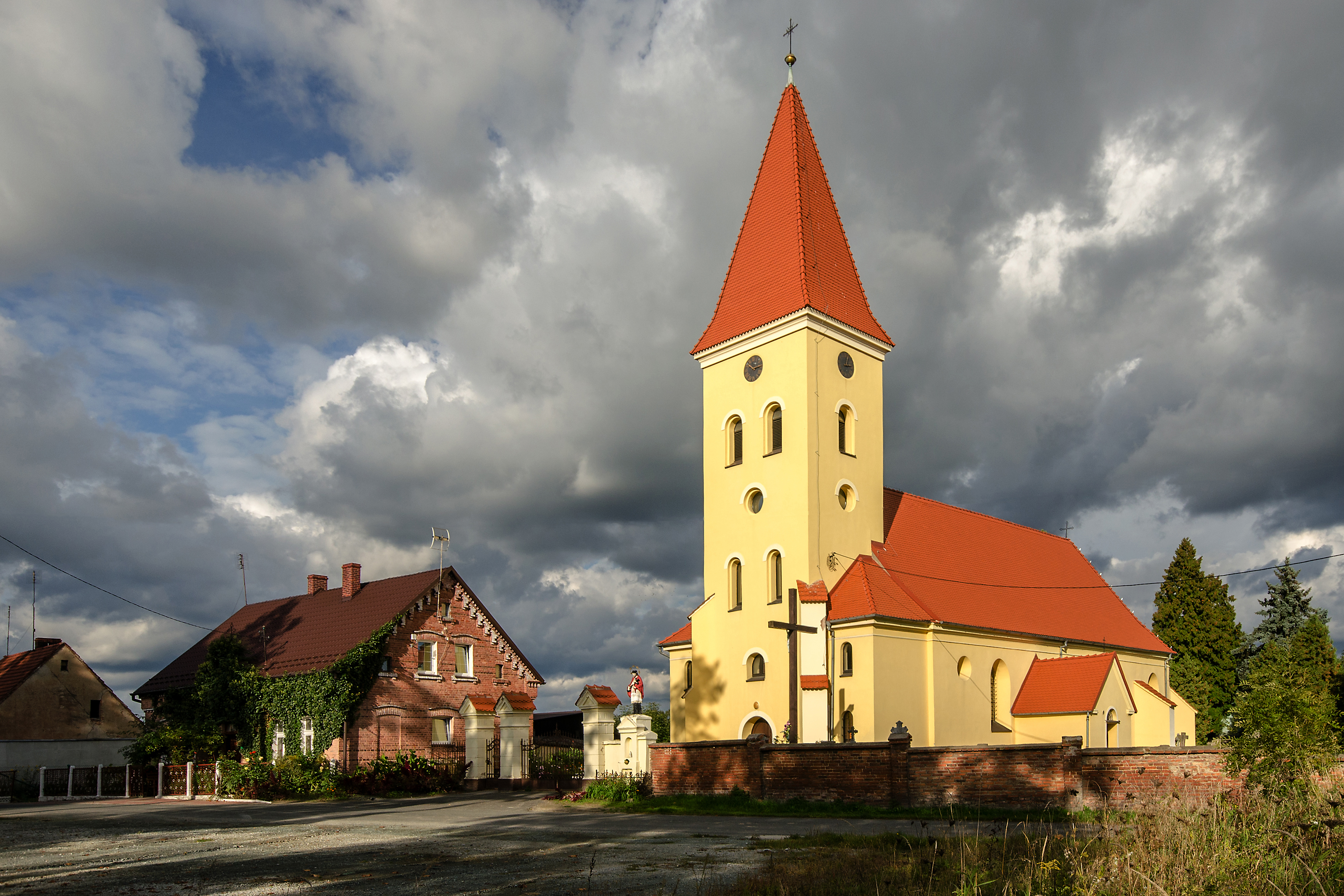
- Saint Lawrence church in Cerekwica

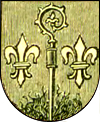
- Coat of arms

- Location within Poland
- Coordinates: 51°18′52″N 17°07′34″E
- Country: Poland
- Voivodeship: Lower Silesian
- County: Trzebnica
- Gmina: Trzebnica
- Time zone: UTC+1 (CET)
  - Summer (DST): UTC+2 (CEST)
- Vehicle registration: DTR

Cerekwica [t͡sɛrɛˈkfit͡sa] is a village (former town) in the administrative district of Gmina Trzebnica, within Trzebnica County, Lower Silesian Voivodeship, in south-western Poland.

== History ==
Town rights were granted in 1252. In 1254, it was ravaged by an alliance of Piast dukes united against Duke Henry III the White. Until 1810 it was a possession of the Diocese of Wrocław.
