= Gmina Zawonia =

Gmina Zawonia Zawonia Commune
- Gmina
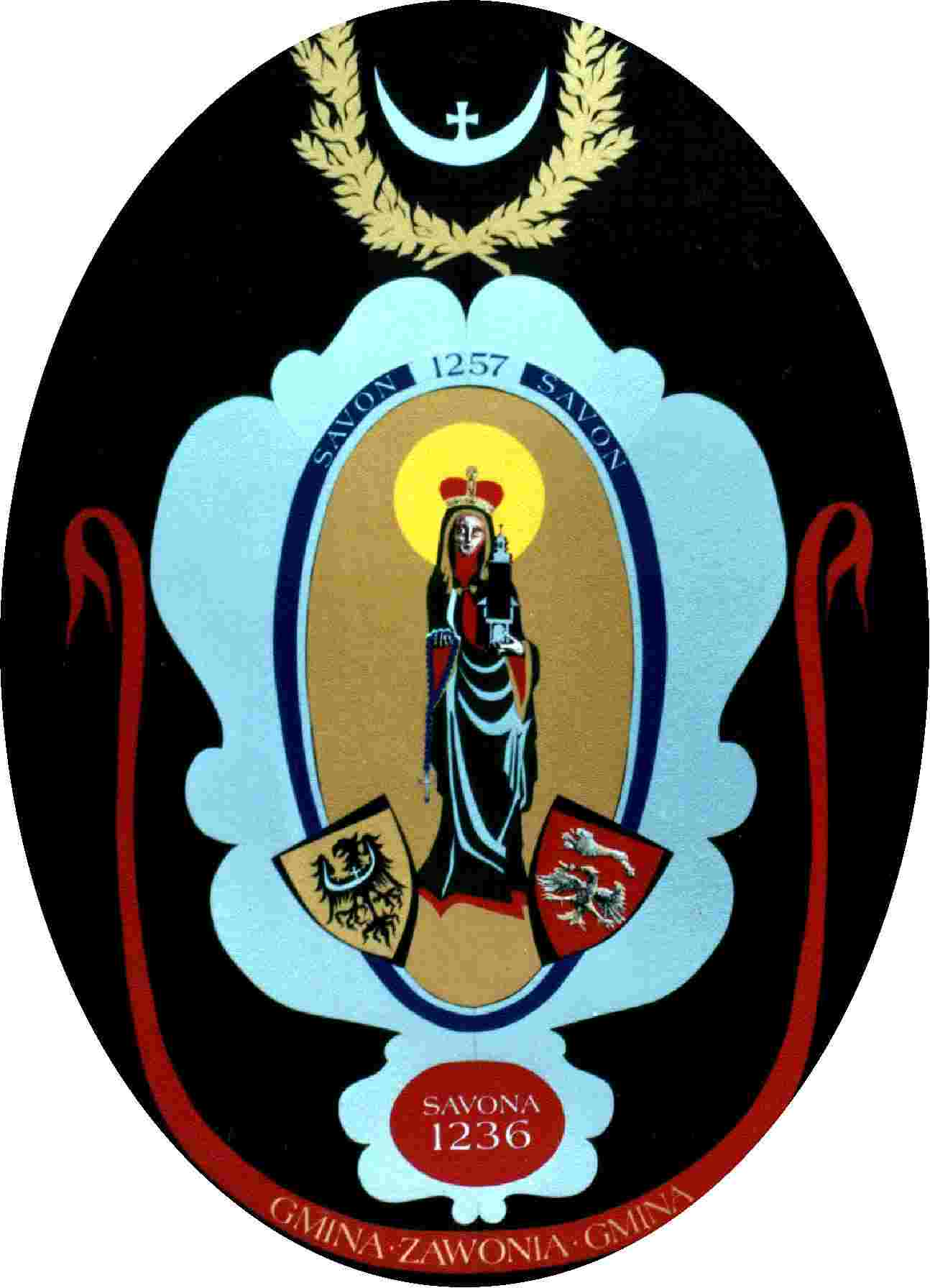
- Coat of arms
- Interactive map of Gmina Zawonia
- Coordinates (Zawonia): 51°18′58″N 17°11′49″E
- Country: Poland
- Voivodeship: Lower Silesian
- County: Trzebnica
- Seat: Zawonia
- Sołectwos: Budczyce, Cielętniki, Czachowo, Czeszów, Głuchów Dolny, Grochowa, Kałowice, Ludgierzowice, Miłonowice, Niedary, Pęciszów, Prawocice, Pstrzejowice, Rzędziszowice, Sędzice, Sucha Wielka, Tarnowiec, Trzęsowice, Zawonia, Złotów

Area
  - Total: 118.12 km^{2} (45.61 sq mi)

Population (2019-06-30)
  - Total: 5,929
  - Density: 50.19/km^{2} (130.0/sq mi)
- Website: https://www.zawonia.pl

Gmina Zawonia is a rural gmina (administrative district) in Trzebnica County, Lower Silesian Voivodeship, in south-western Poland. Its seat is the village of Zawonia, which lies approximately 10 kilometres (6 mi) east of Trzebnica, and 24 kilometres (15 mi) north-east of the regional capital Wrocław. It is part of the Wrocław metropolitan area.

The gmina covers an area of 118.12 square kilometres (45.6 sq mi), and as of 2019 its total population is 5,929.

== Neighbouring gminas ==
Gmina Zawonia is bordered by the gminas of Długołęka, Dobroszyce, Krośnice, Milicz and Trzebnica.

== Villages ==
The gmina contains the villages of Budczyce, Cielętniki, Czachowo, Czeszów, Głuchów Dolny, Grochowa, Kałowice, Kopiec, Ludgierzowice, Miłonowice, Niedary, Pęciszów, Pomianowice, Prawocice, Pstrzejowice, Radłów, Rzędziszowice, Sędzice, Skotniki, Stanięcice, Sucha Mała, Sucha Wielka, Tarnowiec, Trzemsze, Trzęsowice, Zawonia, Złotów and Złotówek.
