= Złotów, Lower Silesian Voivodeship =

Złotów
- Village
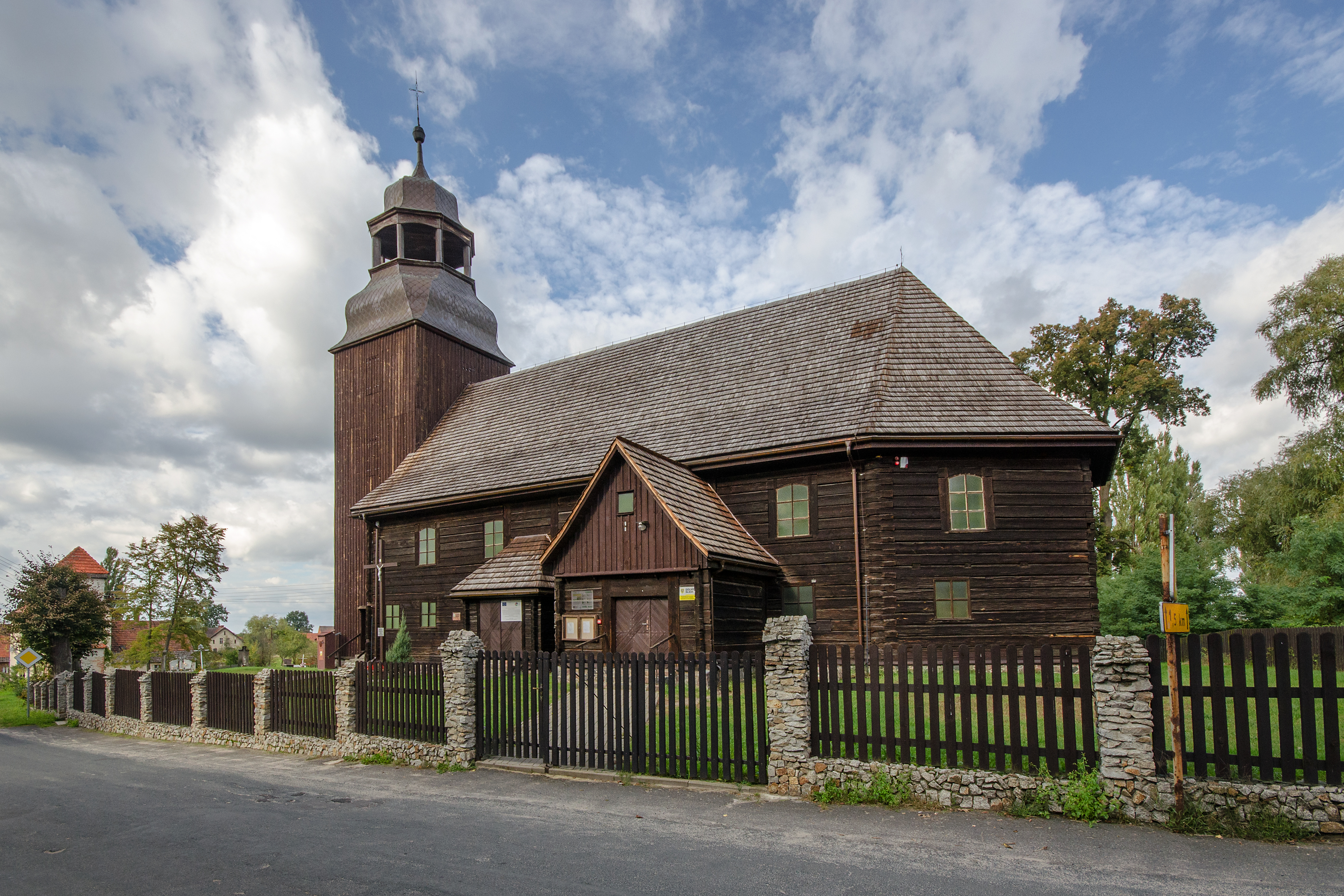
- Catholic church

- Location within Poland
- Coordinates: 51°21′N 17°17′E
- Country: Poland
- Voivodeship: Lower Silesian
- County: Trzebnica
- Gmina: Zawonia

Złotów [ˈzwɔtuf] is a village in the administrative district of Gmina Zawonia, within Trzebnica County, Lower Silesian Voivodeship, in southwestern Poland.
