= Cielętniki, Lower Silesian Voivodeship =

Cielętniki
- Village
- Location within Poland
- Coordinates: 51°17′51″N 17°12′32″E
- Country: Poland
- Voivodeship: Lower Silesian
- County: Trzebnica
- Gmina: Zawonia
- Time zone: UTC+1 (CET)
  - Summer (DST): UTC+2 (CEST)
- Vehicle registration: DTR

Cielętniki [t͡ɕɛlɛntˈniki] is a village in the administrative district of Gmina Zawonia, within Trzebnica County, Lower Silesian Voivodeship, in south-western Poland.

It was mentioned in the Liber fundationis episcopatus Vratislaviensis from ca. 1295–1305 under the Latinized Polish name Czenethniki.
