= Gmina Trzebnica =

Gmina Trzebnica Trzebnica Commune
- Gmina
- Flag Coat of arms
- Interactive map of Gmina Trzebnica
- Coordinates (Trzebnica): 51°18′18″N 17°03′41″E
- Country: Poland
- Voivodeship: Lower Silesian
- County: Trzebnica
- Seat: Trzebnica

Area
  - Total: 200.19 km^{2} (77.29 sq mi)

Population (2019-06-30)
  - Total: 24,380
  - Density: 121.8/km^{2} (315.4/sq mi)
  - Urban: 13,331
  - Rural: 11,049
- Website: https://trzebnica.pl

Gmina Trzebnica is an urban-rural gmina (administrative district) in Trzebnica County, Lower Silesian Voivodeship, in south-western Poland. Its seat is the town of Trzebnica, which lies approximately 20 kilometres (12 mi) north of the regional capital Wrocław. It is part of the Wrocław metropolitan area.

The gmina covers an area of 200.19 square kilometres (77.3 sq mi). As of 2019, its total population was 24,380.

== Neighbouring gminas ==
Gmina Trzebnica is bordered by the gminas of Długołęka, Milicz, Oborniki Śląskie, Prusice, Wisznia Mała, Zawonia and Żmigród.

== Villages ==
Apart from the town of Trzebnica, the gmina contains the villages of Będkowo, Biedaszków Mały, Biedaszków Wielki, Blizocin, Boleścin, Brochocin, Brzezie, Brzyków, Bukowiec, Cerekwica, Domanowice, Droszów, Głuchów Górny, Janiszów, Jaszyce, Jaźwiny, Kanice, Kobylice, Koczurki, Komorówko, Komorowo, Koniówko, Koniowo, Księginice, Kuźniczysko, Ligota, Malczów, Małuszyn, Marcinowo, Masłów, Masłowiec, Nowy Dwór, Piersno, Raszów, Rzepotowice, Skarszyn, Skoroszów, Sulisławice, Świątniki, Szczytkowice, Taczów Mały, Taczów Wielki, Trzy Chałupy, Ujeździec Mały, Ujeździec Wielki and Węgrzynów.

== Twin towns – sister cities ==
Gmina Trzebnica is twinned with:

- Kitzingen, Germany
- Vynnyky, Ukraine
