= Tarczyński Group =

Polish food company

Tarczyński S.A.
- Company type: Joint-stock company
- Industry: Food
- Founded: 1989; 37 years ago
- Headquarters: Ujeździec Mały, Poland
- Area served: Poland
- Key people: Jacek Tarczyński
- Products: Meat
- Revenue: zl 464,800,000
- Number of employees: 1255 (2016)
- Website: grupatarczynski.pl

Tarczyński Group is a corporate group of enterprises specialising in the meat industry. Since June 2013, the joint-stock company is registered on the Warsaw Stock Exchange. The headquarters of the dominating corporate unit is located in Ujeździec Mały, Poland.

The Tarczyński Group handles the production, packaging and distribution of meat produce, specialising in pork and poultry, leading the Polish market in the sale of kabanos and cured meat. The firm holds three production plants in Ujeździec Mały, Bielsko-Biała and Sława.

== History ==
The Zakład Przetwórstwa Mięsnego Jacek Tarczyński was founded in 1989 in Sułów, southwest of Milicz. In 1996, the firm acquired the ownership rights over the agrarian cooperative Spółdzielnia Rolniczo-Handlowa "Samopomoc Polska" located in Trzebnica. Two years later, in 1998, the firm restructured itself as the private limited company Zakład Przetwórstwa Mięsnego "Tarczyński" Sp. z o.o.

In 2004 the ZPM "Tarczyński" transformed into a joint-stock company, with its rebranding completed by 2005. In 2005, the company Dobrosława (founded in 1945) was acquired and transformed to a partnership of the joint-stock company. In 2007, Tarczyński Group acquired 100% of the shares of Starpeck Sp. z o.o., with its headquarters located in Bielsko-Biała. The Tarczyński Group began trading on the Warsaw Stock Exchange as of 18 June 2013.

== Structure ==
The Tarczyński Group has its headquarters located in Ujeździec Mały, near Milicz in Poland. The joint-stock company holds three production plants in:

- Ujeździec Mały – headquarters
- Sława – department
- Bielsko-Biała – department

Apart from the national market in Poland, the Tarczyński Group exports its meat products to other European countries: Estonia, Latvia, Lithuania, Germany, the Netherlands, France, the United Kingdom, Finland Ireland, Italy, Greece, Sweden, Denmark as well as Romania.

Tarczyński Group introduced the following regulations to its structure quality of produce: British Retail Consortium and the International Food Standard.

== Brands and products ==
- Tarczyński – pork and poultry kabanosy in a variety of spiced flavours, bacon, fillet cold cuts, thick and thin kiełbasa, sausages, potted ham, pork ham, cured kiełbasa, Select kabanosy, turkey produce, spiced salami, snack-size kiełbasa, grill-pack kiełbasa.
- Dobrosława – smoked bacon, flat-meat produce, dumpling bakes, ham, bacon ham, thin kiełbasa, homogenised kiełbasa, cured kiełbasa.
- Tarczyński Arena Wrocław, stadium opened in 2011 in Wrocław.
