= Sułów, Lower Silesian Voivodeship =

Sułów
- Village
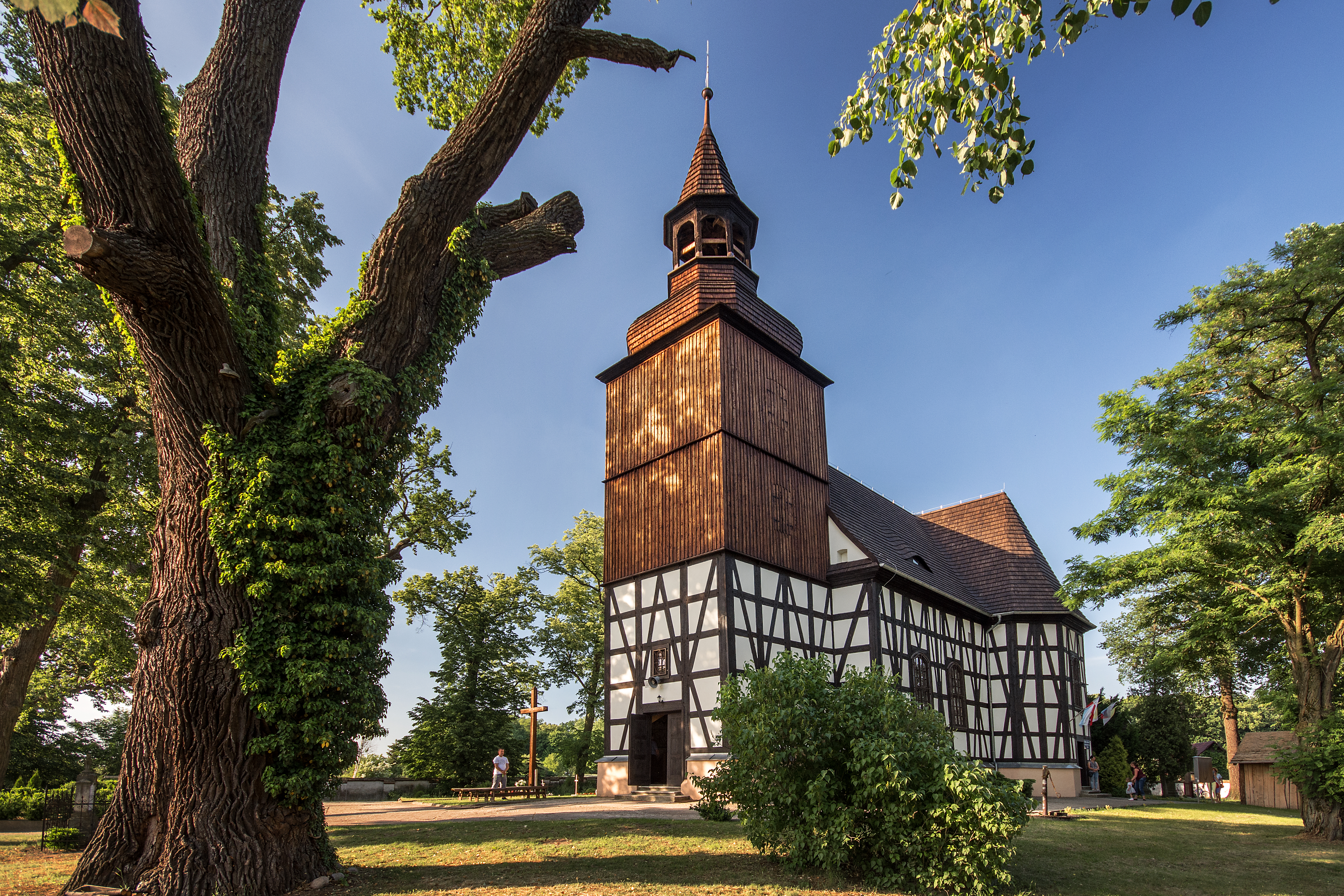
- Sts Peter and Paul Church

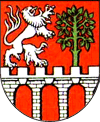
- Coat of arms

- Location within Poland
- Coordinates: 51°30′N 17°10′E
- Country: Poland
- Voivodeship: Lower Silesian
- County: Milicz
- Gmina: Milicz

Population
  - Total: 1,600
- Time zone: UTC+1 (CET)
  - Summer (DST): UTC+2 (CEST)
- Postal code: 56-300
- Vehicle registration: DMI

Sułów ([ˈsuwuf]) (German: Sulau) is a village in the administrative district of Gmina Milicz, within Milicz County, Lower Silesian Voivodeship, in south-western Poland.

== Geography ==
The village is located in the historic Lower Silesia region on the Barycz River within the Milicz Ponds nature reserve, approximately 9 km (6 mi) south-west of Milicz and 43 km (27 mi) north of the regional capital Wrocław.

== History ==
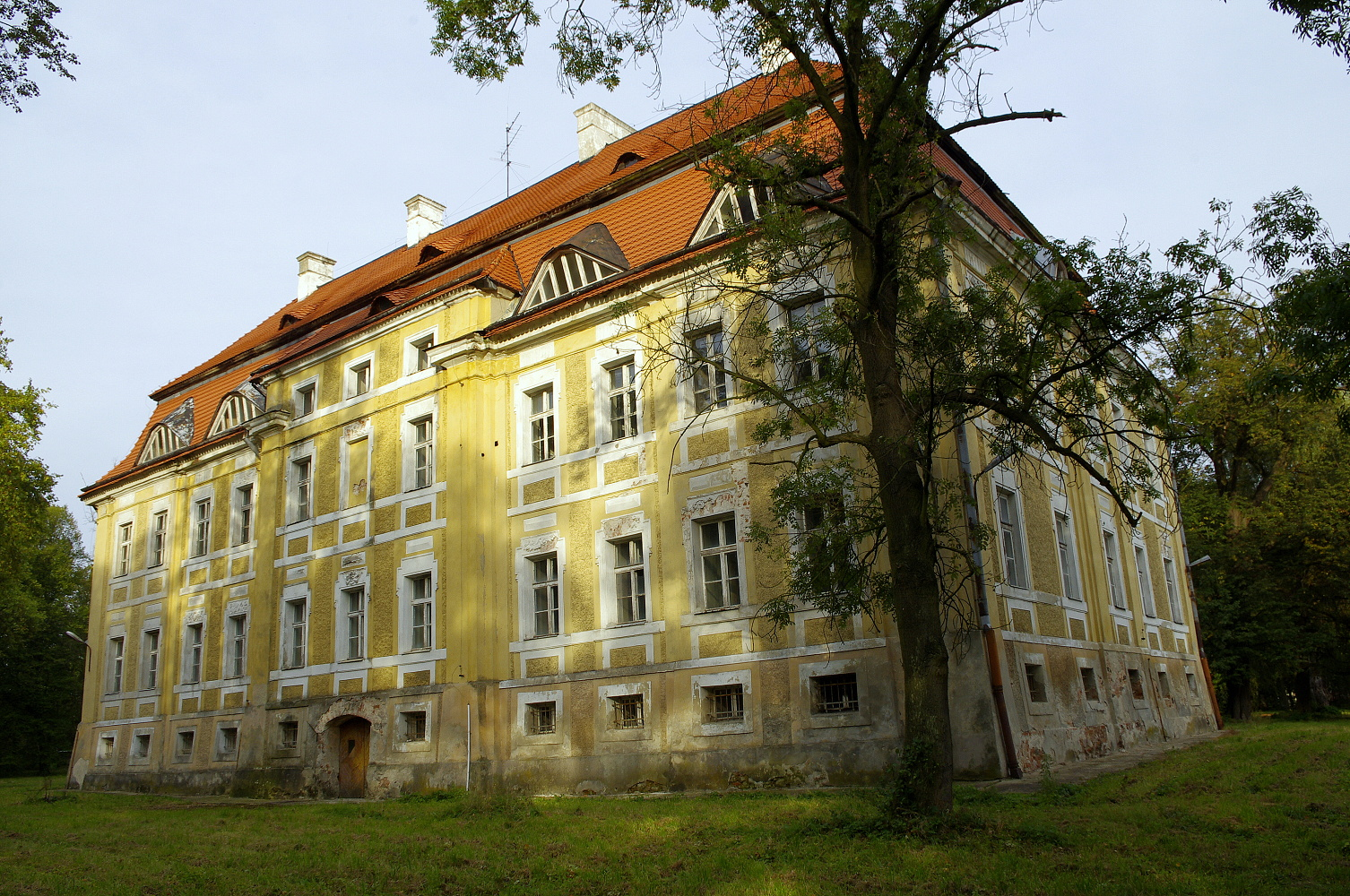
Sułów Castle

The territory became part of the emerging Polish state in the 10th century, and after the country's fragmentation into smaller provincial duchies, it formed part of the duchies of Silesia/Wrocław, Głogów and Oleśnica, ruled by the Piast dynasty until 1492. The first Sułów Castle, built by the Dukes of Oleśnica was mentioned in 1351. Later a base of robber barons, it was finally destroyed by Wrocław citizens about 1500. During the Thirty Years' War, on 28 July 1645, a battle between Swedes and Austrians was fought near the village. The preserved Baroque castle with gardens was erected in the late 17th century. In 1775, it was granted town rights, lost after World War II in 1945. In Polish, it was historically also known as Sulejewo, Suława and Zuława.

The Tarczyński Group meat produce company was founded in Sułów in 1989 by Jacek Tarczyński.

== Sights ==
Sułów is known for its two timber framed churches, Sts Peter and Paul built in 1731-34 and Our Lady of Częstochowa erected in 1765–67, and the Baroque Sułów Castle.
