= Zawonia, Lower Silesian Voivodeship =

Zawonia
- Village
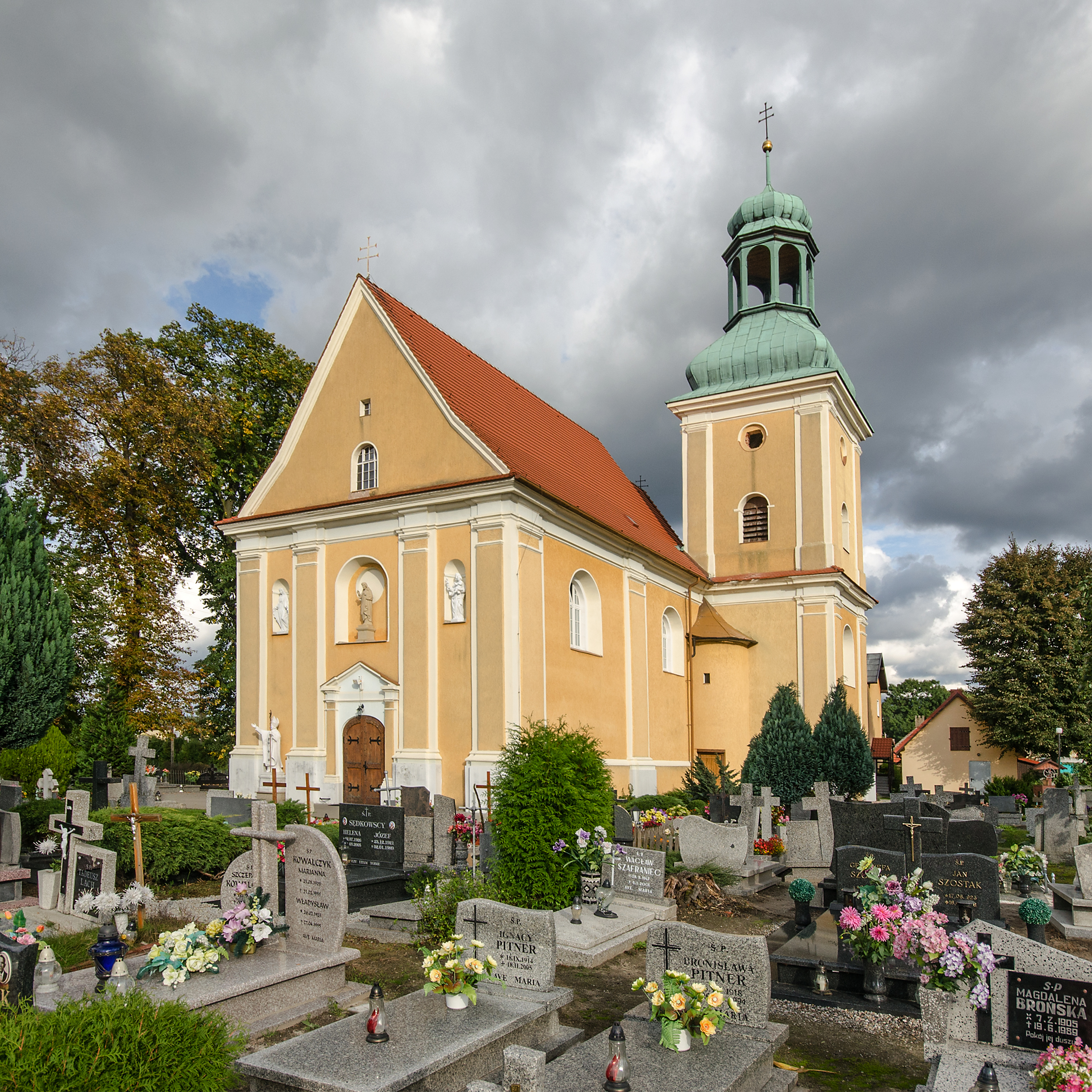
- Church and cemetery

- Location within Poland
- Coordinates: 51°18′56″N 17°11′57″E
- Country: Poland
- Voivodeship: Lower Silesian
- County: Trzebnica
- Gmina: Zawonia

Zawonia ([zaˈvɔɲa]) (German: Schawoine) is a village in Trzebnica County, Lower Silesian Voivodeship, in south-western Poland. It is the seat of the administrative district (gmina) called Gmina Zawonia.
