= Kobylice =

- Municipality
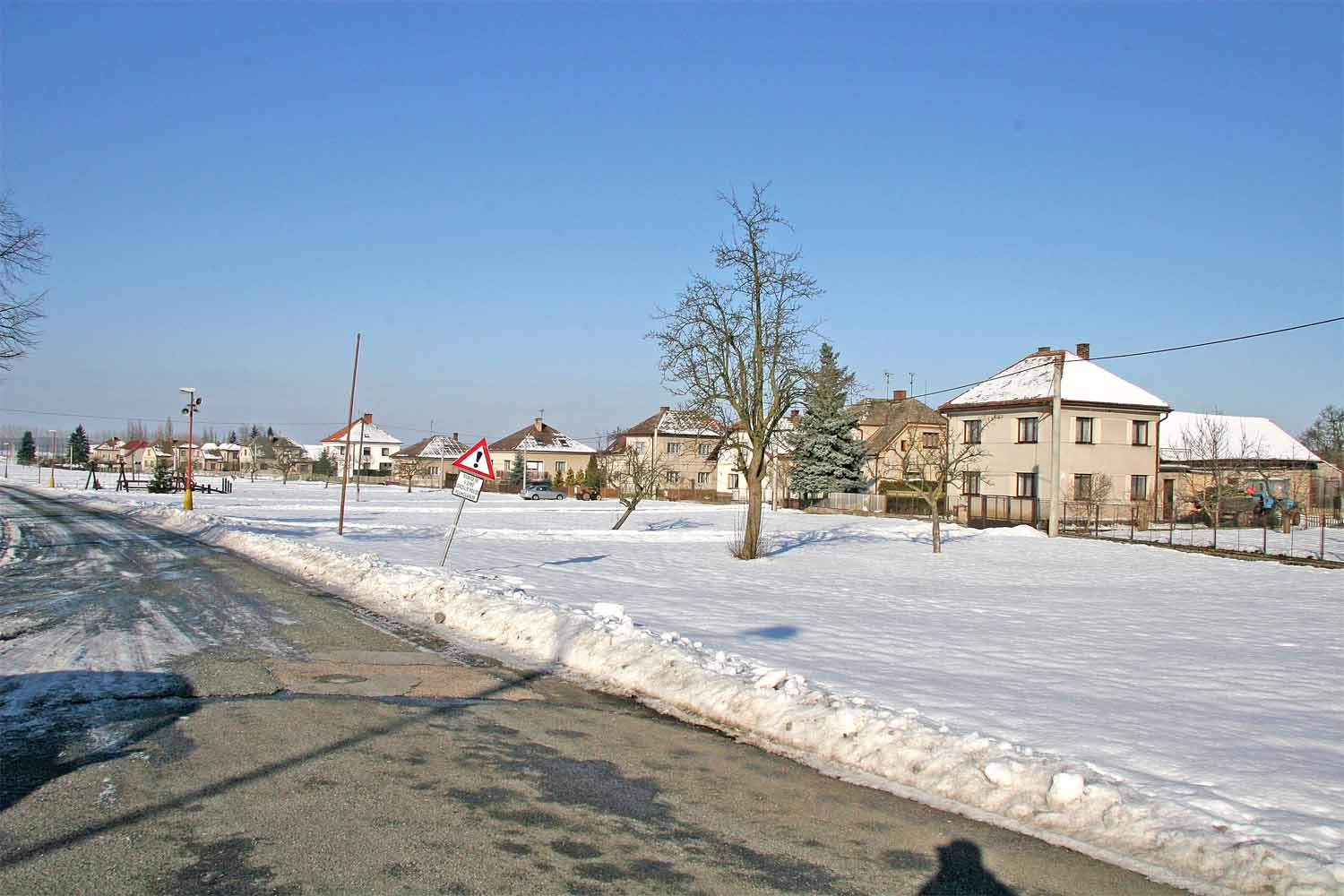
- Centre of Kobylice

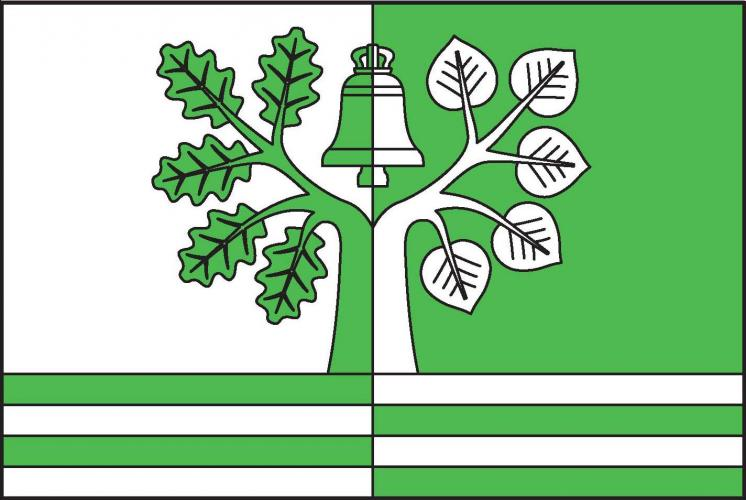
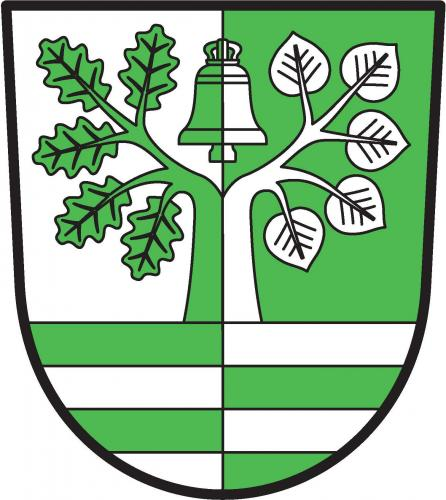
- Flag Coat of arms

- Location in the Czech Republic
- Coordinates: 50°14′45″N 15°35′14″E
- Country: Czech Republic
- Region: Hradec Králové
- District: Hradec Králové
- First mentioned: 1086

Area
  - Total: 6.17 km^{2} (2.38 sq mi)
- Elevation: 245 m (804 ft)

Population (2026-01-01)
  - Total: 260
  - Density: 42/km^{2} (110/sq mi)
- Time zone: UTC+1 (CET)
  - Summer (DST): UTC+2 (CEST)
- Postal code: 504 01
- Website: www.kobylice.cz

Kobylice is a municipality and village in Hradec Králové District in the Hradec Králové Region of the Czech Republic. It has about 300 inhabitants.

== Demographics ==
Historical population
Year	Pop.	±%
1869	233	—
1880	251	+7.7%
1890	233	−7.2%
1900	261	+12.0%
1910	264	+1.1%
1921	245	−7.2%
1930	228	−6.9%
1950	168	−26.3%
1961	151	−10.1%
1970	141	−6.6%
1980	180	+27.7%
1991	176	−2.2%
2001	189	+7.4%
2011	255	+34.9%
2021	263	+3.1%
Source: Censuses
