= Trzebnica County =

Coordinates: 51°18′18″N 17°03′41″E

Trzebnica County Powiat trzebnicki
- County
- Flag Coat of arms

- Location within the voivodeship
- Country: Poland
- Voivodeship: Lower Silesian
- Seat: Trzebnica
- Gminas: Total 6: Gmina Oborniki Śląskie; Gmina Prusice; Gmina Trzebnica; Gmina Wisznia Mała; Gmina Zawonia; Gmina Żmigród

Area
  - Total: 1,025.55 km^{2} (395.97 sq mi)

Population (2019-06-30)
  - Total: 85,092
  - Density: 82.972/km^{2} (214.90/sq mi)
  - Urban: 31,108
  - Rural: 53,984
- Car plates: DTR
- Website: powiat.trzebnica.pl

Trzebnica County (Polish: powiat trzebnicki) is a unit of territorial administration and local government (powiat) in Lower Silesian Voivodeship, south-western Poland. It came into being on January 1, 1999, as a result of the Polish local government reforms passed in 1998. The county covers an area of 1,025.5 square kilometres (395.9 sq mi). Its administrative seat is Trzebnica, and it also contains the towns of Oborniki Śląskie, Żmigród and Prusice.

As of 2019 the total population of the county is 85,092. The most populated towns are Trzebnica with 13,331 inhabitants and Oborniki Śląskie with 9,099 inhabitants.

== Neighbouring counties ==
Trzebnica County is bordered by Rawicz County and Milicz County to the north, Oleśnica County to the east, Wrocław County and the city of Wrocław to the south, Środa County and Wołów County to the west, and Góra County to the north-west.

== Administrative divisions ==
The county is subdivided into six gminas (four urban-rural and two rural). These are listed in the following table, in descending order of population.

Gmina	Type	Area (km^{2})	Population (2019)	Seat
Gmina Trzebnica	urban-rural	200.2	24,380	Trzebnica
Gmina Oborniki Śląskie	urban-rural	153.8	20,261	Oborniki Śląskie
Gmina Żmigród	urban-rural	292.1	14,666	Żmigród
Gmina Wisznia Mała	rural	103.3	10,482	Wisznia Mała
Gmina Prusice	urban-rural	158.0	9,374	Prusice
Gmina Zawonia	rural	118.1	5,929	Zawonia
