= Asselin =

Asselin is a surname. Notable people with the surname include:

- Christopher Asselin (born 1969), American politician
- Edmund Tobin Asselin (1920–1999), Canadian politician, administrator and businessman
- Émile Asselin (born 1996), Canadian curler
- Félix Asselin (born 1994), Canadian curler
- Guillaume Asselin (born 1992), Canadian ice hockey player
- Gérard Asselin (1950–2013), Canadian politician
- Janelle Asselin (born 1983), American comic book editor
- Jean-Louis Asselin de Cherville (1772–1822), French Orientalist
- Joe Asselin (born 1977), American musician
- Jonathan Asselin (born 1958), Canadian equestrian
- Joseph-Omer Asselin (1890–1961), Canadian businessman and politician
- Josh Asselin (born 1978), American basketball player
- Kevin Asselin (born 1985), Canadian ice hockey player
- Louis-Napoléon Asselin (1850–1921), Canadian lawyer and politician
- Marie-Anne Asselin (1888–1971), Canadian mezzo-soprano
- Marie-Claude Asselin (born 1962), Canadian freestyle skier
- Mario Asselin, Canadian politician
- Martial Asselin (1924–2013), Canadian politician
- Mathieu Asselin (born 1973), French-Venezuelan photographer
- Maurice Asselin (1882–1947), French artist
- Michèle Asselin, Canadian activist
- Olivar Asselin (1874–1937), Canadian writer and journalist
- Olivia Asselin (born 2004), Canadian freestyle skier
- Olivier Asselin, Canadian film director and screenwriter
- Patrick Tobin Asselin (1930–2005), Canadian politician
- Pierre-Aurèle Asselin (1881–1964), French Canadian furrier and tenor singer
- Robert Asselin (born 1974), Canadian author and public policy expert
- Roland Asselin (1917–2003), Canadian fencer
