= Oslin =

Oslin may refer to:

- George P. Oslin (1899–1996), reporter, executive at Western Union and author on the history of telecommunication
- K. T. Oslin (1942–2020), American country music singer and songwriter
- Sidney Oslin Smith Jr. (1923–2012), former United States federal judge

== See also ==
- Osolin
- Ossolin (disambiguation)
- Asselin
- Uuslinn
