= Pierre-Aurèle Asselin =

Canadian opera singer (1881–1964)

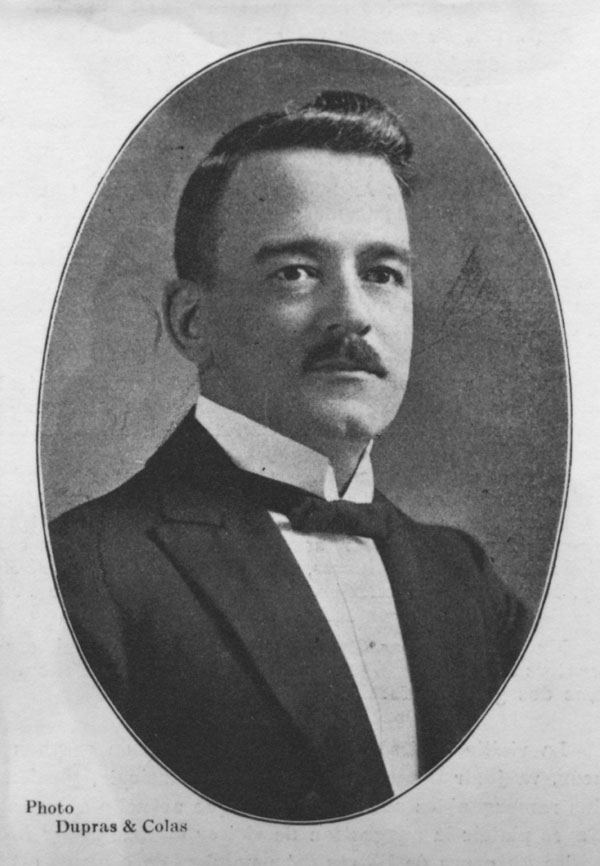
Pierre-Aurèle Asselin in December 1917

Pierre-Aurèle Asselin (1881–1964) was a French Canadian furrier and tenor singer. Asselin came from a musical family; he was the brother of mezzo-soprano Marie-Anne Asselin and great uncle of pianist André Asselin.

Asselin was born in the town of Sainte-Famille on Île d'Orléans in 1881. He moved with his family to Montreal around 1901, and, in 1903, he married Cora Laviolette in Notre-Dame cathedral.

== Singing career ==
Asselin began a career as a furrier soon after his marriage. He would remain a furrier until his retirement. Asselin sang in church for some time, but it would not be until 1916, when he was 35, that he would make his first professional performance. He performed for Ladies' Morning Musical Club of Quebec City, a club devoted to classical music appreciation. He was well received and, within a year, had signed a contract with Columbia Records. Under this contract, he recorded arias from French operas, various songs from operettas, and other classical songs.

Asselin also gave live performances. In April 1917, he performed in the oratorio Les Sept Paroles du Christ at the Montreal Cathedral. His first solo concert followed that October. He joined the Sociéte nationale d'opéra comique, but it quickly disbanded. In September 1918, he appeared at the Cartier Theatre and the Orpheum Theatre, alongside Blanche Gonthier.

Starting in November 1918, Asselin made recordings for the Edison recording label. His recordings were released in several formats, including Royal Purple Grand Opera Cylinder Records 29000 series, the Blue Amberol 27000 cylinder series and the Edison Diamonds 74000 series of disks. Through Edison, Asselin released a variety of recordings of arias and other serious classical works. Asselin continued recording with Edison until December 1920.

In May 1921, Asselin resigned with Columbia Records. He recorded eight songs in New York with them, which included arias by Donizetti, Godard, and Massenet, two duets with Guillaume Dupuis using contemporary melodies and a duet with Blanche Gonthier of Sur le lac d'argent by Fauré.

Asselin made his last recording for the Brunswick record company in 1929. Soon after, he disappeared from professional music and focused his efforts on his fur business. Asselin died in Montreal on December 27, 1964, leaving his fur business to his son Raymond.

== Recordings ==
[see the talk page regarding Edison recordings]

1917

- Columbia 3069 Side A: Aime-moi by Bemberg (Tenor solo in French, with orchestra) (3:27) Side B: Noël du mariage by Choudens (Tenor solo in French, with orchestra) (3:13)
- Columbia E3203 Side A: À l'inconnue by Cécile Chaminade (Tenor solo in French, with orchestra) (3:30) Side B: Madrigal by Cécile Chaminade (Tenor solo in French, with orchestra) (3:12)
- Columbia E3213 Side A: Priez, aimez, chantez by Gregh (Tenor solo in French, with orchestra) (3:10) Side B: Tu me dirais by Chaminade (Tenor solo in French, with orchestra) (2:50)

1918

- Columbia E3454 Side A: Ouvre à l'amour (Tenor solo in French, with orchestra) (3:32) Side B: Ivresse d'oiseaux (Tenor solo in French, with orchestra) (3:18)
- Columbia E3701 Side A: L'adieu du matin by Pessard (Tenor solo in French, with orchestra) (3:15) Side B: Crédo by Faure (Bass solo in French by J.M. Magnan, with orchestra) (3:26)
- Edison Blue Amberol 27182 Cantique de Noël by Adolphe Adam (Tenor solo in French, with orchestra)
- Edison Blue Amberol 27183 Madrigal by Cécile Chaminade (Tenor solo in French, with orchestra)

1919

- Edison Blue Amberol 27185 O salutaris by Théodore Salomé (Tenor solo in Latin, with orchestra)
- Edison Blue Amberol 27184 L'adieu du matin by Emile Pessard and Louis Gregh (Tenor solo in French, with orchestra)

1920

- Edison Royal Purple Amberol: 29055 Ah! leve-toi, soleil! from Roméo et Juliette by Charles Gounod

1921

- E7183 Columbia Side A: Berceuse from the opera Jocelyn (Tenor solo in French, with orchestra) (2:34) Side B: Sur les bords de la Riviera (Tenor in French, with Baritone Guillaume Dupuis and orchestra) (2:53)
- E7195 Columbia Side A: Ah fuyez, douce image from Manon by Massenet (Tenor solo in French, with orchestra) (2:56) Side B: Ange si pur from La favorite by Donizetti (Tenor solo in French, with orchestra) (2:46)

1922

- E7208 Columbia Side A: Sur le lac d'argent by Fauré (Tenor in French, with Soprano Blanche Gauthier, and orchestra) (3:04) Side B: Pour toi by Codini and Courtioux (Tenor solo in French, and orchestra) (3:14)
