= Golędzinów =

Golędzinów may refer to the following places in Poland:

- Golędzinów in Gmina Oborniki Śląskie, Trzebnica County in Lower Silesian Voivodeship (SW Poland)
- Other places called Golędzinów (listed in Polish Wikipedia)
