= Nowosielce =

Nowosielce may refer to the following places in Poland:

- Nowosielce, Trzebnica County in Lower Silesian Voivodeship (south-west Poland)
- Nowosielce, Przeworsk County in Subcarpathian Voivodeship (south-east Poland)
- Nowosielce, Sanok County in Subcarpathian Voivodeship (south-east Poland)
