= Siemianice =

Siemianice may refer to the following places in Poland:

- Siemianice, Lower Silesian Voivodeship (south-west Poland)
- Siemianice, Greater Poland Voivodeship (west-central Poland)
- Siemianice, Pomeranian Voivodeship (north Poland)
