= Przecławice =

Przecławice may refer to the following places in Poland:

- Przecławice, Trzebnica County in Gmina Oborniki Śląskie, Trzebnica County in Lower Silesian Voivodeship (SW Poland)
- Przecławice, Wrocław County in Gmina Żórawina, Wrocław County in Lower Silesian Voivodeship (SW Poland)
