= Kuraszków =

Kuraszków may refer to the following places in Poland:

- Kuraszków, Lower Silesian Voivodeship (south-west Poland)
- Kuraszków, Łódź Voivodeship (central Poland)
