= Morzęcin Mały =

- Village
- Location within Poland
- Coordinates: 51°20′34″N 16°51′38″E
- Country: Poland
- Voivodeship: Lower Silesian
- County: Trzebnica
- Gmina: Oborniki Śląskie

Morzęcin Mały (Polish pronunciation: [mɔˈʐɛɲtɕin ˈmawɨ]) is a village in the administrative district of Gmina Oborniki Śląskie, within Trzebnica County, Lower Silesian Voivodeship, in south-western Poland.
