= Brzeźno Małe, Lower Silesian Voivodeship =

Village in Silesia

Brzeźno Małe
- Village
- Location within Poland
- Coordinates: 51°16′36″N 16°53′28″E
- Country: Poland
- Voivodeship: Lower Silesian
- County: Trzebnica
- Gmina: Oborniki Śląskie

Brzeźno Małe [ˈbʐɛʑnɔ ˈmawɛ] is a village in the administrative district of Gmina Oborniki Śląskie, within Trzebnica County, Lower Silesian Voivodeship, in south-western Poland.
