= Trzebnickie Hills =

Polish mountain range

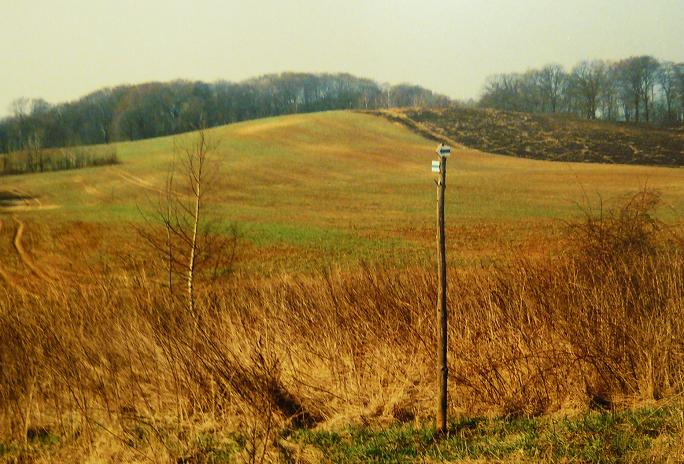
- Ciemna Góra (Mount Dark)

Highest point
- Peak: Mount Ciemna
- Elevation: 258.3 m (847 ft)
- Coordinates: 51°17′N 17°3′E

Geography
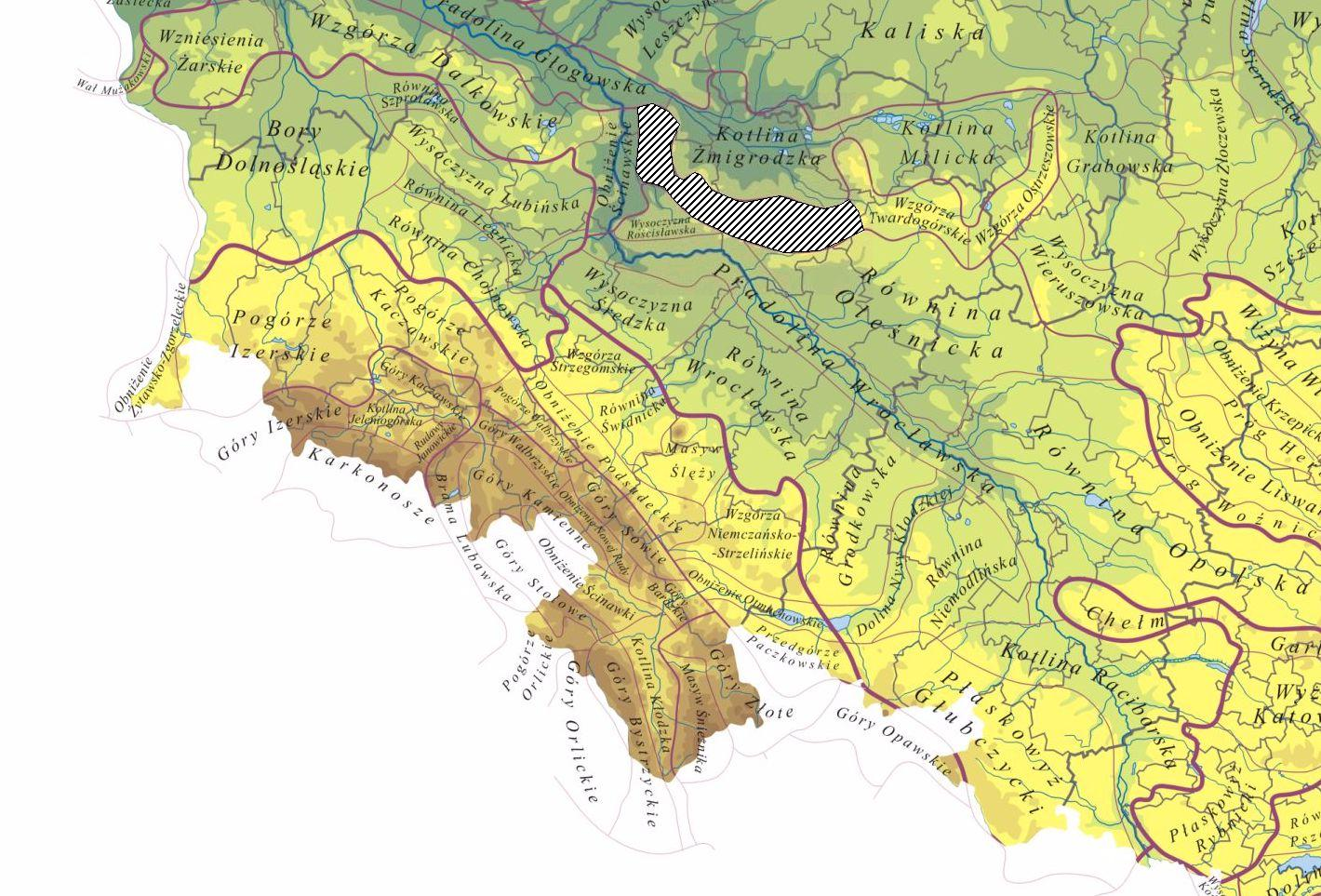
- Geomorphical divisions of southwestern Poland, Trzebnickie Hills hatched
- Country: Poland
- State: Lower Silesia

The Trzebnickie Hills (Polish: Wzgórza Trzebnickie, also Kocie Góry from German: Katzengebirge, "Cat Mountains") is a mountain range in southwestern Poland. It is named after the town of Trzebnica on the northern slope.

The range is located in the Lower Silesian Voivodeship. It lies north of the regional capital Wrocław, between the Oder and Widawa Rivers to the southwest and the Barycz River to the north. The terminal moraine was formed during the Wolstonian Stage of the Pleistocene (300,000 - 130,000 years BC), consisting of boulder, gravel and clay with loess sediments on the surface. The landscape is made up of fields, woods and orchards; in the Middle Ages it was also the site of several vineyards.

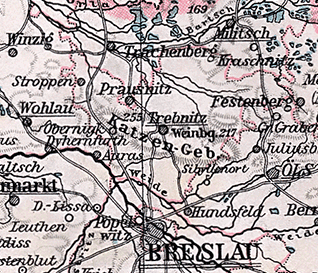
Katzengebirge north of Breslau (Wrocław) on a 1905 German map

Towns located near the hills include:

- Oborniki Śląskie
- Oleśnica
- Prusice
- Syców
- Trzebnica
- Twardogóra
- Wołów
- Wrocław
