= Rościsławice =

- Village
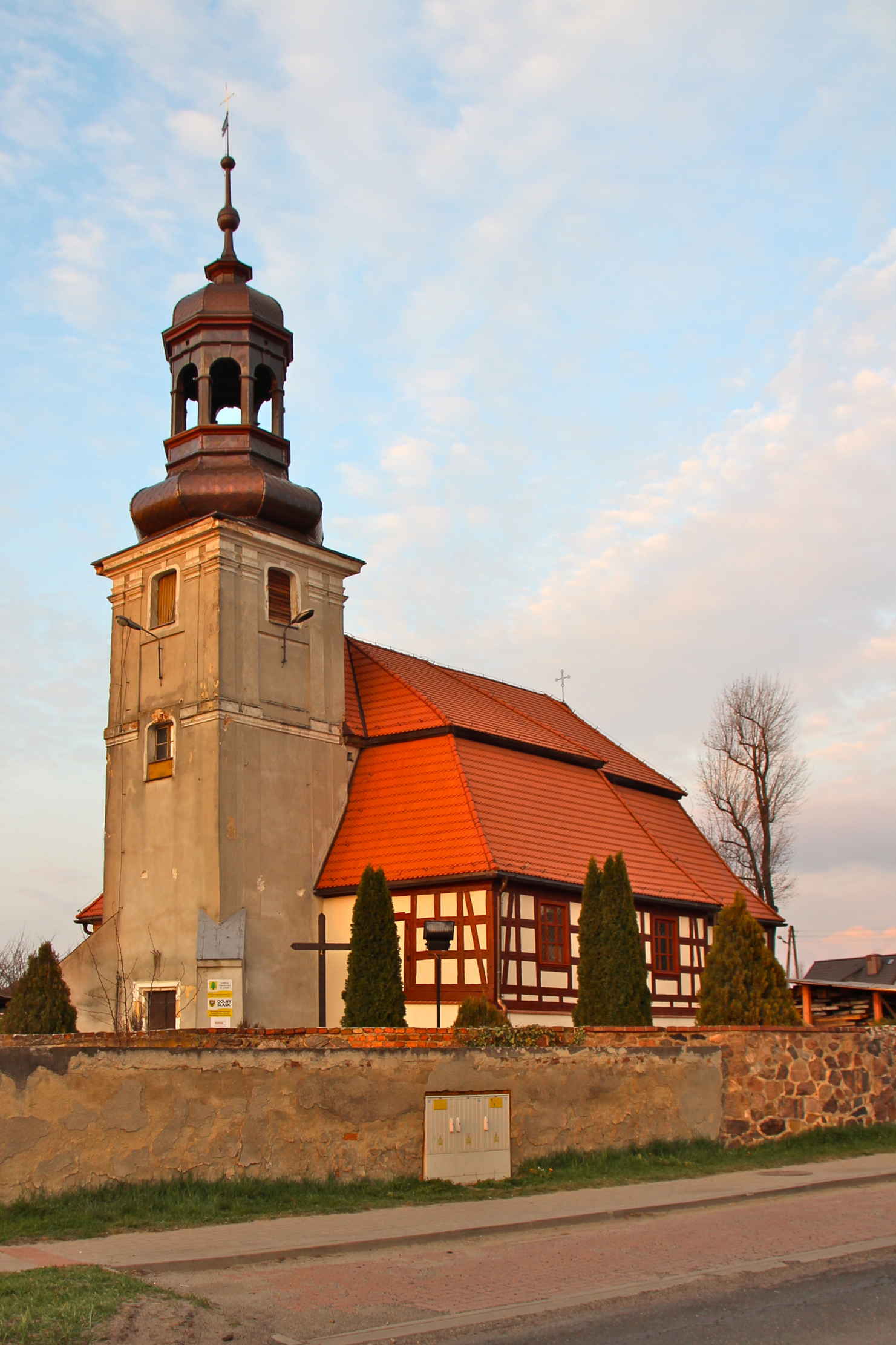
- Church in Rościsławice (2012)

- Location within Poland
- Coordinates: 51°18′N 16°51′E
- Country: Poland
- Voivodeship: Lower Silesian
- County: Trzebnica
- Gmina: Oborniki Śląskie

Rościsławice [rɔɕt͡ɕiswaˈvit͡sɛ] is a village in the administrative district of Gmina Oborniki Śląskie, within Trzebnica County, Lower Silesian Voivodeship, in Southwestern Poland.

Rościsławice was first mentioned in 1343. Since 1550, it had been owned by the city of Wrocław. In 1795, it consisted of 81 buildings with 467 inhabitants, including an evangelical church, two school buildings, a mill, and a palace. In 1845, it had grown to 113 houses, a palace, and a farm. The farm included two windmills, a brickyard, a brewery, and a distillery. In addition, the area had a coffee shop near Warteberg Hill. The village remained the property of the city of Wrocław until 1945 and was often leased. The farm was leased to various people, including Glofka, Scholz, and Willy Schmidthals. By 1886, the estate had grown to 1202 ha, with 798 ha of forests, and livestock included 29 horses and 122 cattle.

The village is also well known for its large sunflower population, and has been called the sunflower capital.
