= Osola =

- Village
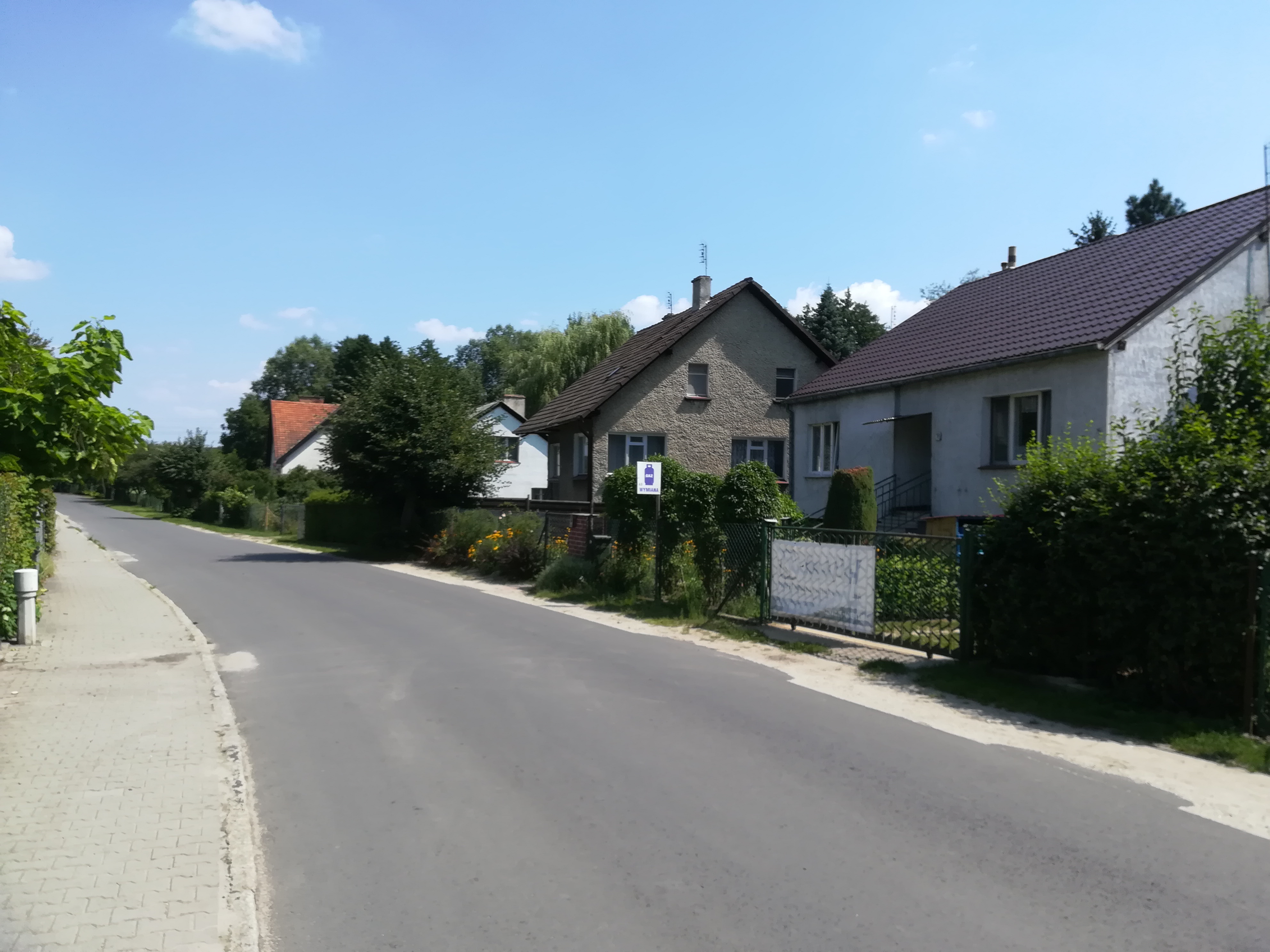

- Location within Poland
- Coordinates: 51°20′N 16°52′E
- Country: Poland
- Voivodeship: Lower Silesian
- County: Trzebnica
- Gmina: Oborniki Śląskie

Osola [ɔˈsɔla] is a village in the administrative district of Gmina Oborniki Śląskie, within Trzebnica County, Lower Silesian Voivodeship, in south-western Poland. It’s known for its forested surroundings, making it a spot for weekend tourism, and has a railway station on the Wrocław-Poznań line with historical ties to the Lusatian culture.
