= Wielka Lipa =

- Village
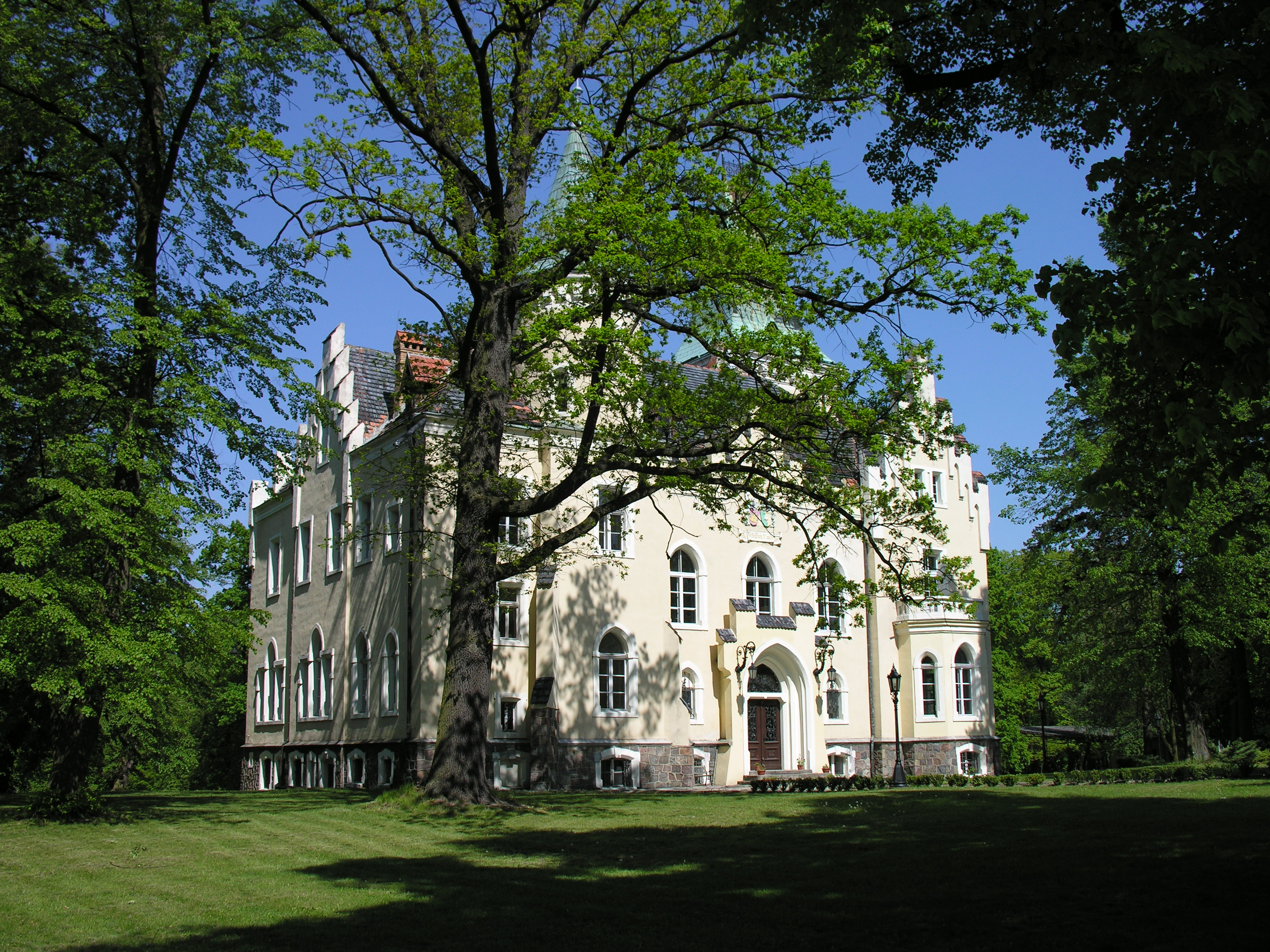
- Palace in Wielka Lipa

- Location within Poland
- Coordinates: 51°19′29″N 16°51′23″E
- Country: Poland
- Voivodeship: Lower Silesian
- County: Trzebnica
- Gmina: Oborniki Śląskie

Wielka Lipa ([ˈvjɛlka ˈlipa]; German: Groß Leipe) is a village in the administrative district of Gmina Oborniki Śląskie, within Trzebnica County, Lower Silesian Voivodeship, in south-western Poland.

== Notable people ==
- Hans Karl von Diebitsch (1785–1831), German-born Russian field marshal
