= Pęgów, Lower Silesian Voivodeship =

Pęgów
- Village
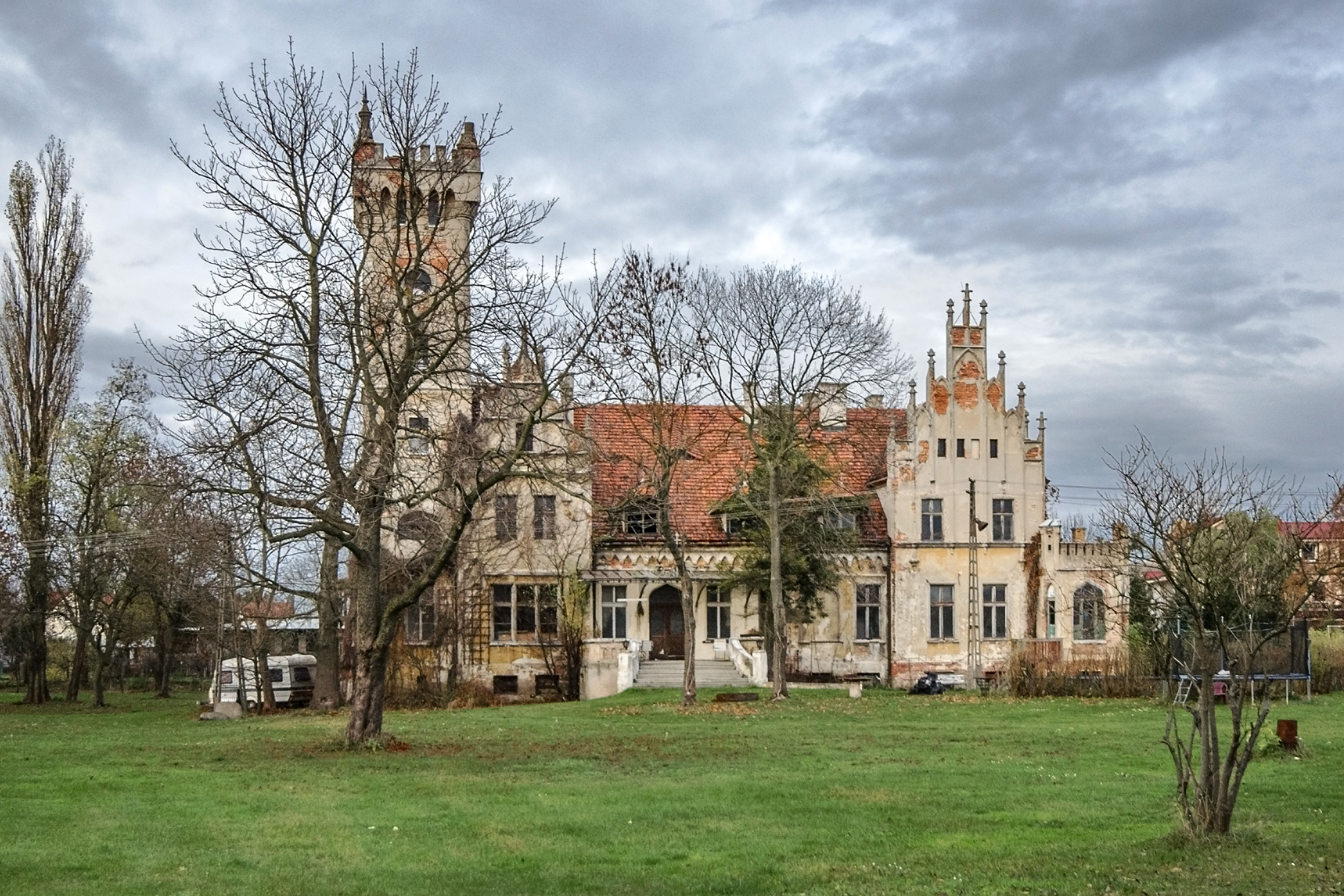
- Pęgów Palace

- Location within Poland
- Coordinates: 51°14′45″N 16°56′02″E
- Country: Poland
- Voivodeship: Lower Silesian
- County: Trzebnica
- Gmina: Oborniki Śląskie
- Population: 1,650

Pęgów [ˈpɛŋɡuf] is a village in the administrative district of Gmina Oborniki Śląskie, within Trzebnica County, Lower Silesian Voivodeship, in south-western Poland.
