= Borkowice, Lower Silesian Voivodeship =

Borkowice
- Village
- Location within Poland
- Coordinates: 51°17′43″N 16°59′33″E
- Country: Poland
- Voivodeship: Lower Silesian
- County: Trzebnica
- Gmina: Oborniki Śląskie
- Population: 84

Borkowice [bɔrkɔˈvit͡sɛ] is a village in the administrative district of Gmina Oborniki Śląskie, within Trzebnica County, Lower Silesian Voivodeship, in south-western Poland.
