= Kotowice, Trzebnica County =

Kotowice
- Village
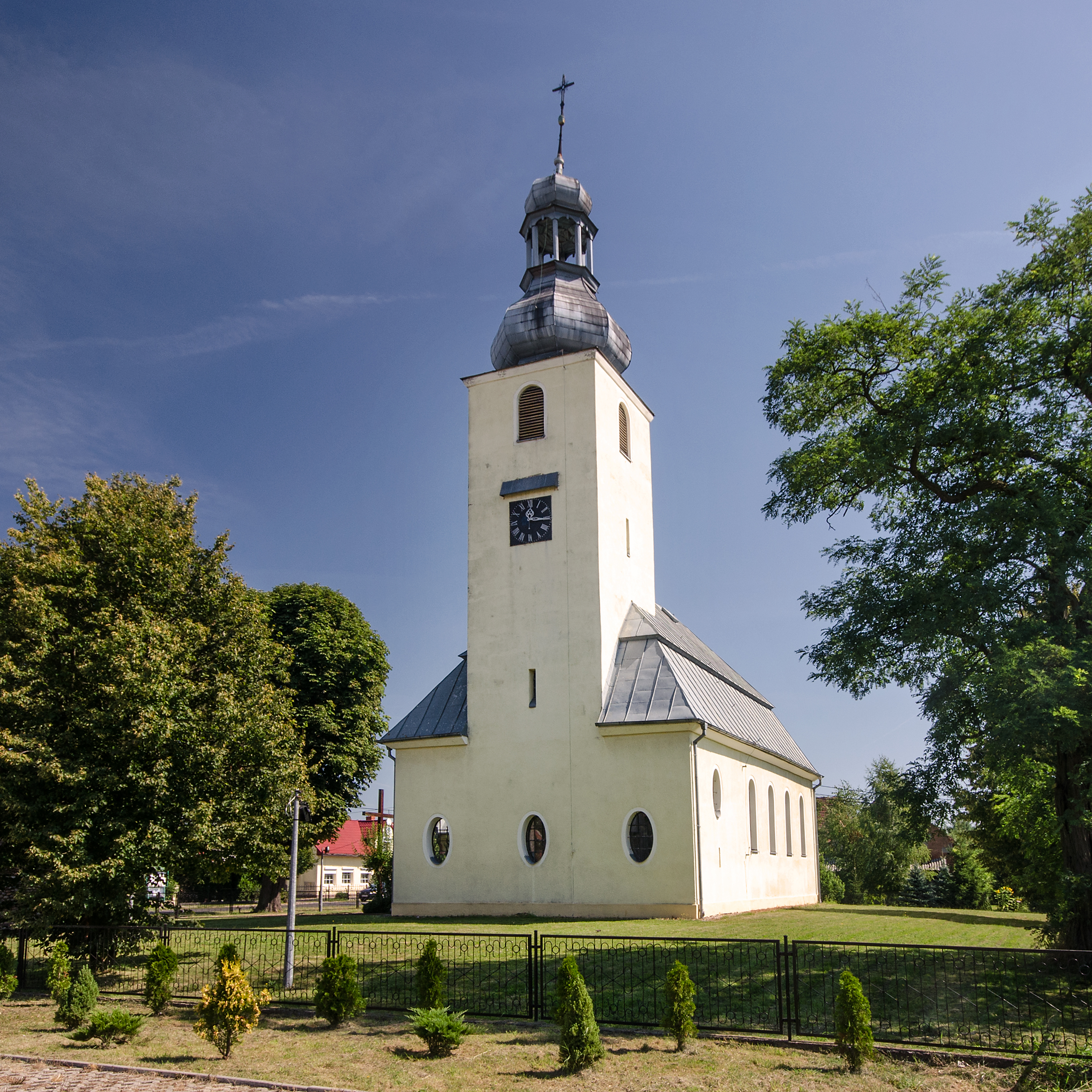
- Saint Martin Church

- Location within Poland
- Coordinates: 51°13′26″N 16°55′16″E
- Country: Poland
- Voivodeship: Lower Silesian
- County: Trzebnica
- Gmina: Oborniki Śląskie

Kotowice [kɔtɔˈvit͡sɛ] is a village in the administrative district of Gmina Oborniki Śląskie, within Trzebnica County, Lower Silesian Voivodeship, in south-western Poland.
