= Bagno, Lower Silesian Voivodeship =

Bagno
- Village
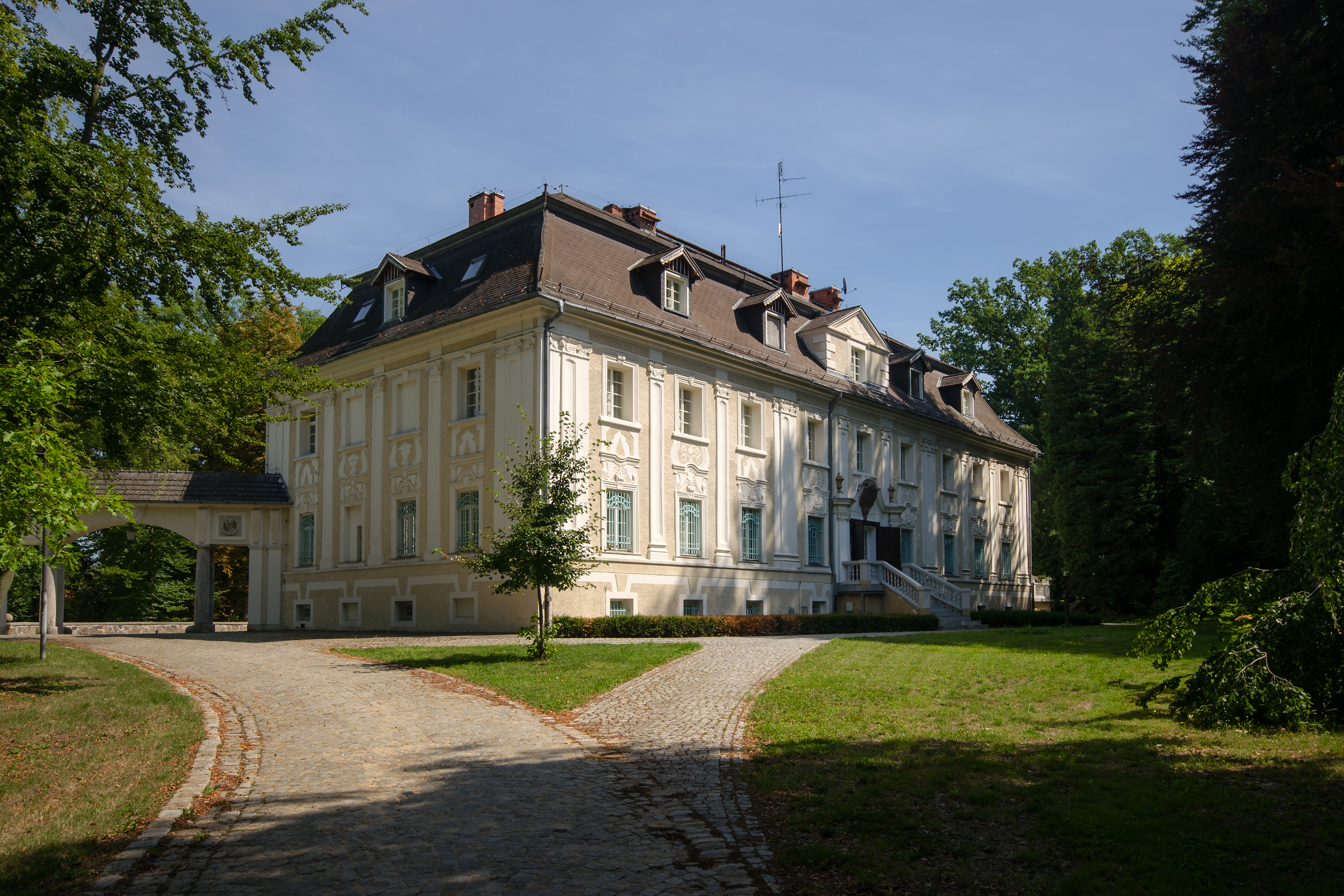
- Palace in Bagno

- Location within Poland
- Coordinates: 51°20′19″N 16°49′10″E
- Country: Poland
- Voivodeship: Lower Silesian
- County: Trzebnica
- Gmina: Oborniki Śląskie

Bagno [ˈbaɡnɔ] is a village in the administrative district of Gmina Oborniki Śląskie, within Trzebnica County, Lower Silesian Voivodeship, in south-western Poland.

The 18th century Bagno Palace today is home to a seminary of the Salvatorian order.

== History ==
The beginning of Bagno dates back to the 13th century, and the first historical mention comes from 1301. Over the centuries, the Bagno estate was owned by various families, including von Haugwitz, von Lamberg, von Wentzky, von Seherr-Thoss, von Posadowsky and von Schönaich-Beuthen.
