= Jary, Lower Silesian Voivodeship =

Jary
- Village
- Location within Poland
- Coordinates: 51°17′00″N 16°52′05″E
- Country: Poland
- Voivodeship: Lower Silesian
- County: Trzebnica
- Gmina: Oborniki Śląskie
- Elevation: 130 m (430 ft)
- Population: 110

Jary [ˈjarɨ] is a village in the administrative district of Gmina Oborniki Śląskie, within Trzebnica County, Lower Silesian Voivodeship, in south-western Poland.
