= Piekary, Trzebnica County =

Piekary
- Village
- Location within Poland
- Coordinates: 51°19′43″N 16°58′14″E
- Country: Poland
- Voivodeship: Lower Silesian
- County: Trzebnica
- Gmina: Oborniki Śląskie

Piekary [pjɛˈkarɨ] is a village in the administrative district of Gmina Oborniki Śląskie, within Trzebnica County, Lower Silesian Voivodeship, in south-western Poland.
