= Lubnów, Trzebnica County =

Lubnów
- Village
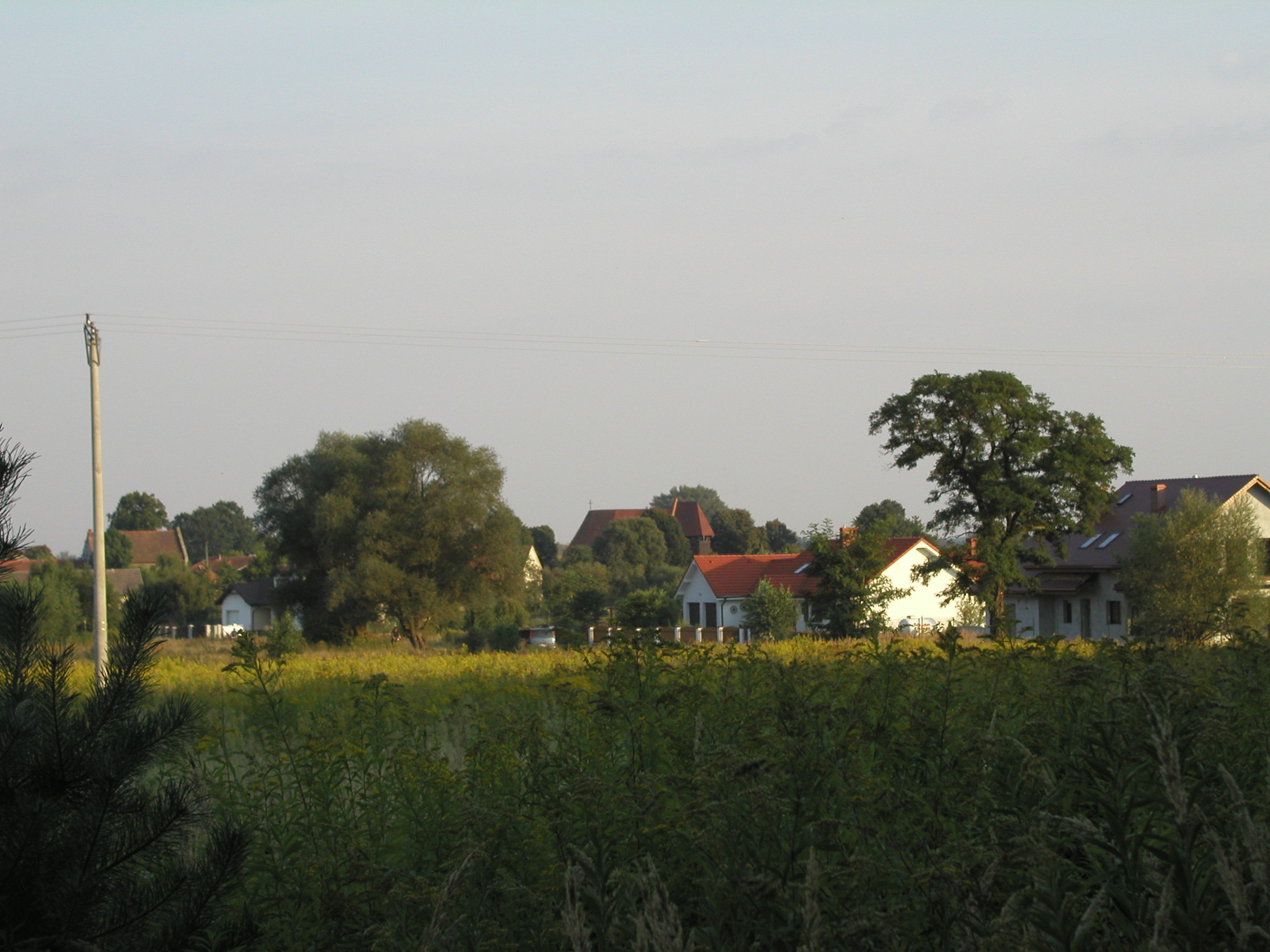

- Location within Poland
- Coordinates: 51°15′36″N 16°53′05″E
- Country: Poland
- Voivodeship: Lower Silesian
- County: Trzebnica
- Gmina: Oborniki Śląskie
- Population: 460

Lubnów [ˈlubnuf] is a village in the administrative district of Gmina Oborniki Śląskie, within Trzebnica County, Lower Silesian Voivodeship, in south-western Poland.
