= Oborniki Śląskie =

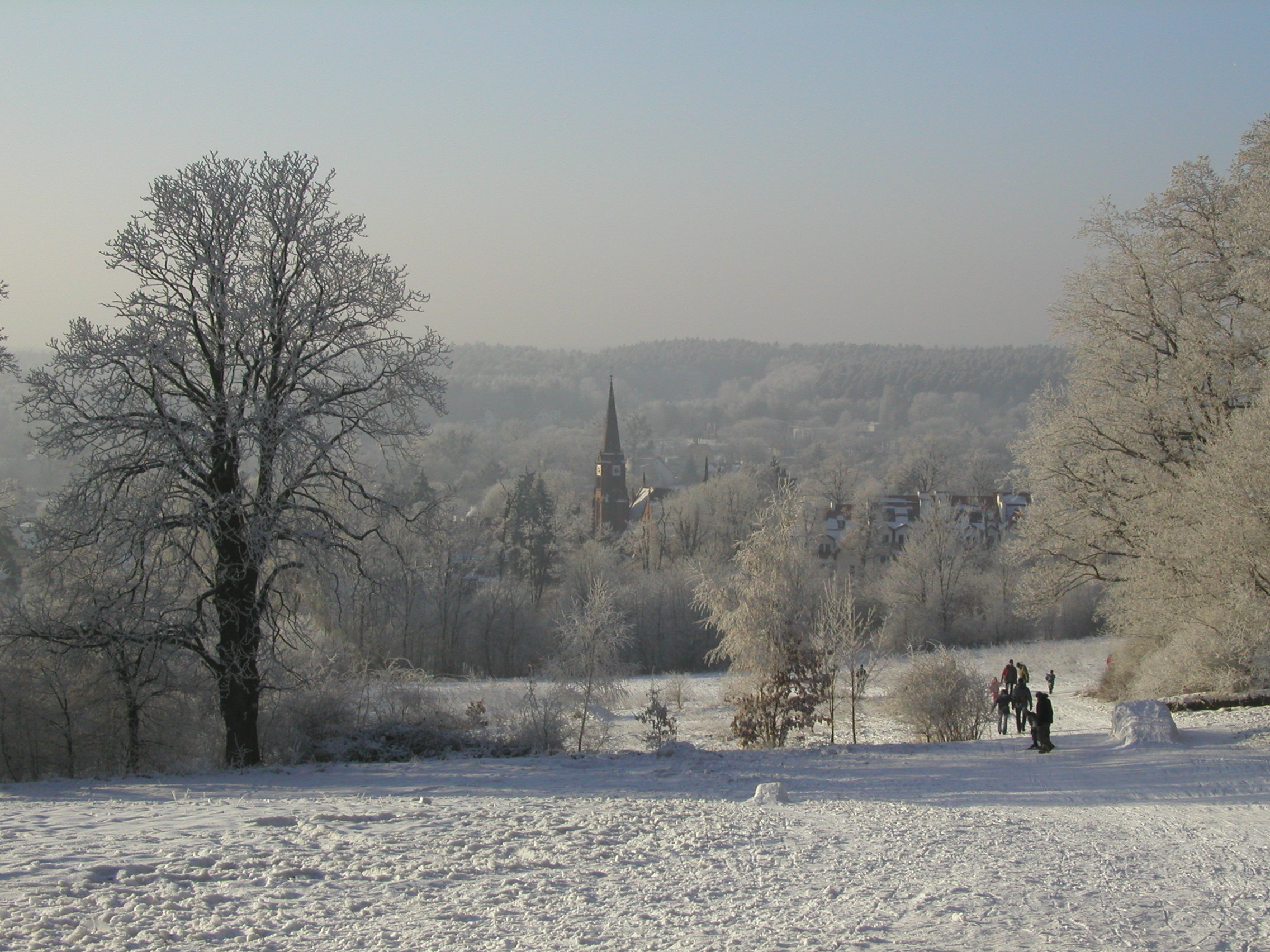
- View of the town in winter

- Flag Coat of arms
- Motto: Tu mi się podoba (I like it here)
- Location within Poland
- Coordinates: 51°17′55″N 16°54′6″E
- Country: Poland
- Voivodeship: Lower Silesian
- County: Trzebnica
- Gmina: Oborniki Śląskie
- Established: 13th century
- Town rights: 1945

Government
  - Mayor: Arkadiusz Poprawa

Area
  - Total: 14.46 km^{2} (5.58 sq mi)
- Highest elevation: 220 m (720 ft)
- Lowest elevation: 170 m (560 ft)

Population (2019-06-30)
  - Total: 9,099
  - Density: 629.3/km^{2} (1,630/sq mi)
- Time zone: UTC+1 (CET)
  - Summer (DST): UTC+2 (CEST)
- Postal code: 55-120
- Area code: +48 71
- License plates: DTR
- Website: http://www.oborniki-slaskie.pl

Oborniki Śląskie [ɔbɔrˈɲikʲi ˈɕlɔ̃skʲɛ] (German: Obernigk) is a town in southwestern Poland. It is located in the northeastern part of the Lower Silesian Voivodeship and is part of Trzebnica County. It is the seat of the administrative district (gmina) called Gmina Oborniki Śląskie. A resort and spa since the 1830s. It is part of the Wrocław metropolitan area. As of 2019 it has a population of 9,099.

== Etymology ==
One theory of the town's name is that it derives from Obora (Polish for "cow-shed"), denoting a village whose people were engaged in cattle-breeding. Another theory suggests it derives from O bor, meaning forest, indicating it was taken from pine and fir forests that were growing on loess deposited land. However, the town is surrounded by oak trees, not by pine or fir. The town's name remained largely unchanged through its history, including variations like Obora, Obornik, Obiring, Obernigk. The suffix Śląskie ("Silesian") was added after 1945 to differentiate the town from Oborniki in Greater Poland Voivodeship.

== History ==
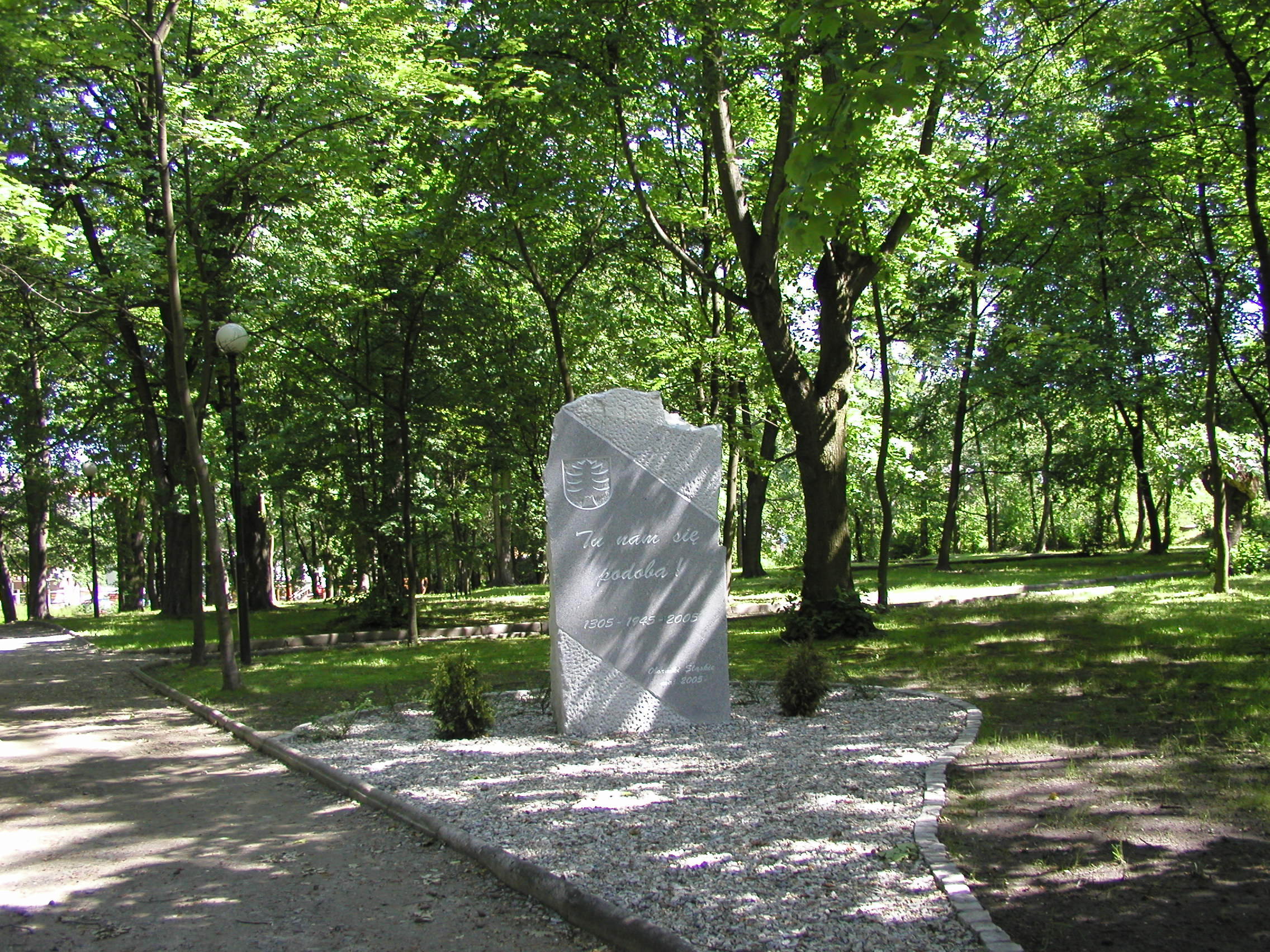
A 2005-monument commemorating the 700th anniversary of the first mention of Oborniki and the 60th anniversary of receiving town rights

The earliest known human traces in this area comes from the Mesolithic Kurgans characteristic for early Bronze Age Lusatian culture have been found nearby, as well as artifacts such as Mesolithic flint tools and Neolithic axes.

=== Medieval and early modern period ===
The area became part of the emerging Polish state under Mieszko I of Poland in the 10th century. Oborniki was first mentioned in a Latin document of Diocese of Wrocław called Liber fundationis episcopatus Vratislaviensis from around 1305 as Obora among the villages obliged to pay a tithe to the Bishopric of Wrocław. Cistercians once lived near the town, which was based on Magdeburg rights, although it did not actually have the status of a town. In the early 14th century, the town was transferred from the Bishops of Wrocław to Duke Konrad I of Oleśnica.

Along with the rest of Silesia, Oborniki came under the suzerainty of the Kingdom of Bohemia, part of the Holy Roman Empire, during the Late Middle Ages. The region was inherited by the Habsburg monarchy of Austria in 1526 and taken by the Kingdom of Prussia in 1742 during the Silesian Wars. It was administered in the Prussian Province of Silesia as Obernigk.

=== 19th and 20th centuries ===
Historic churches of Oborniki Śląskie

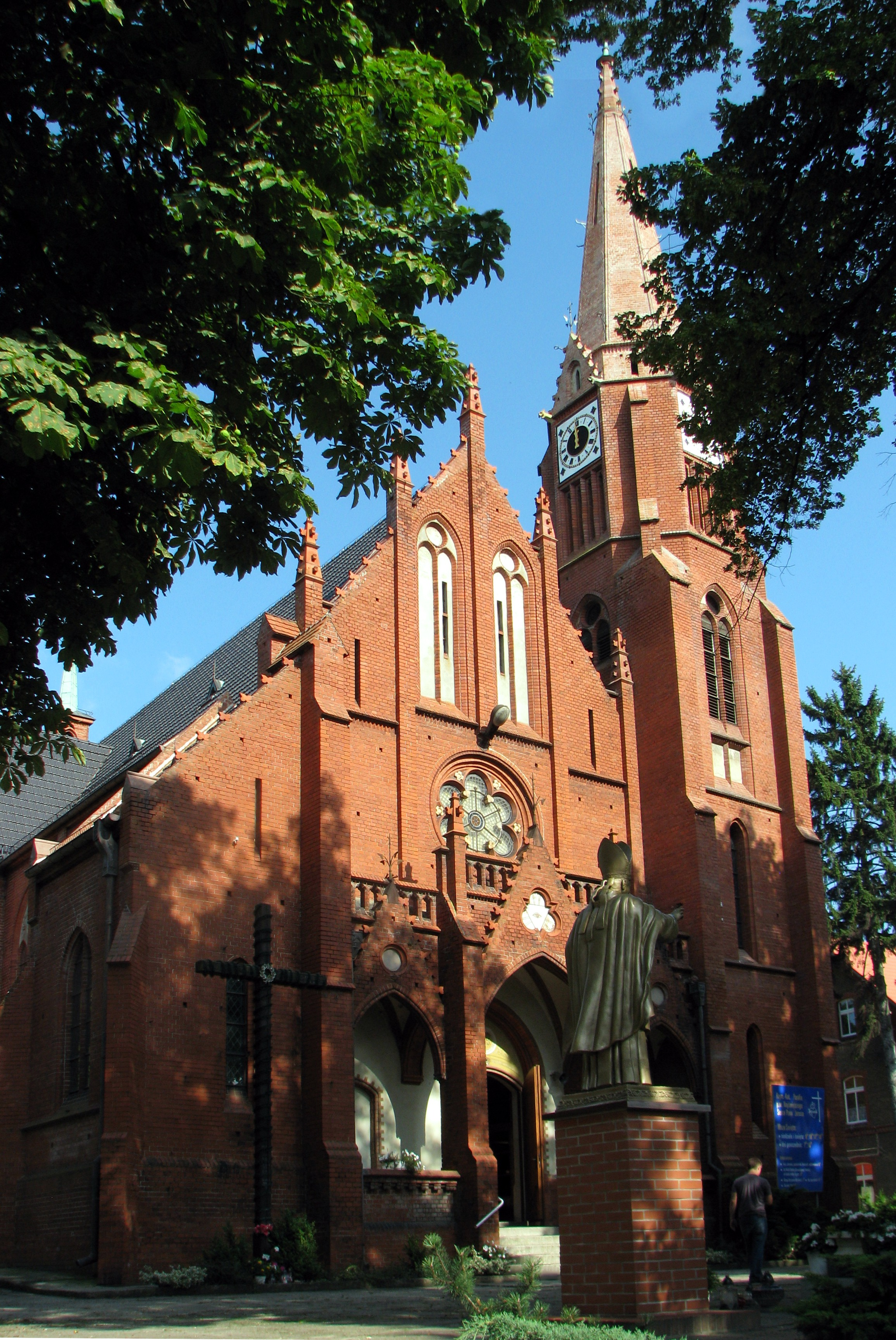
Sacred Heart church

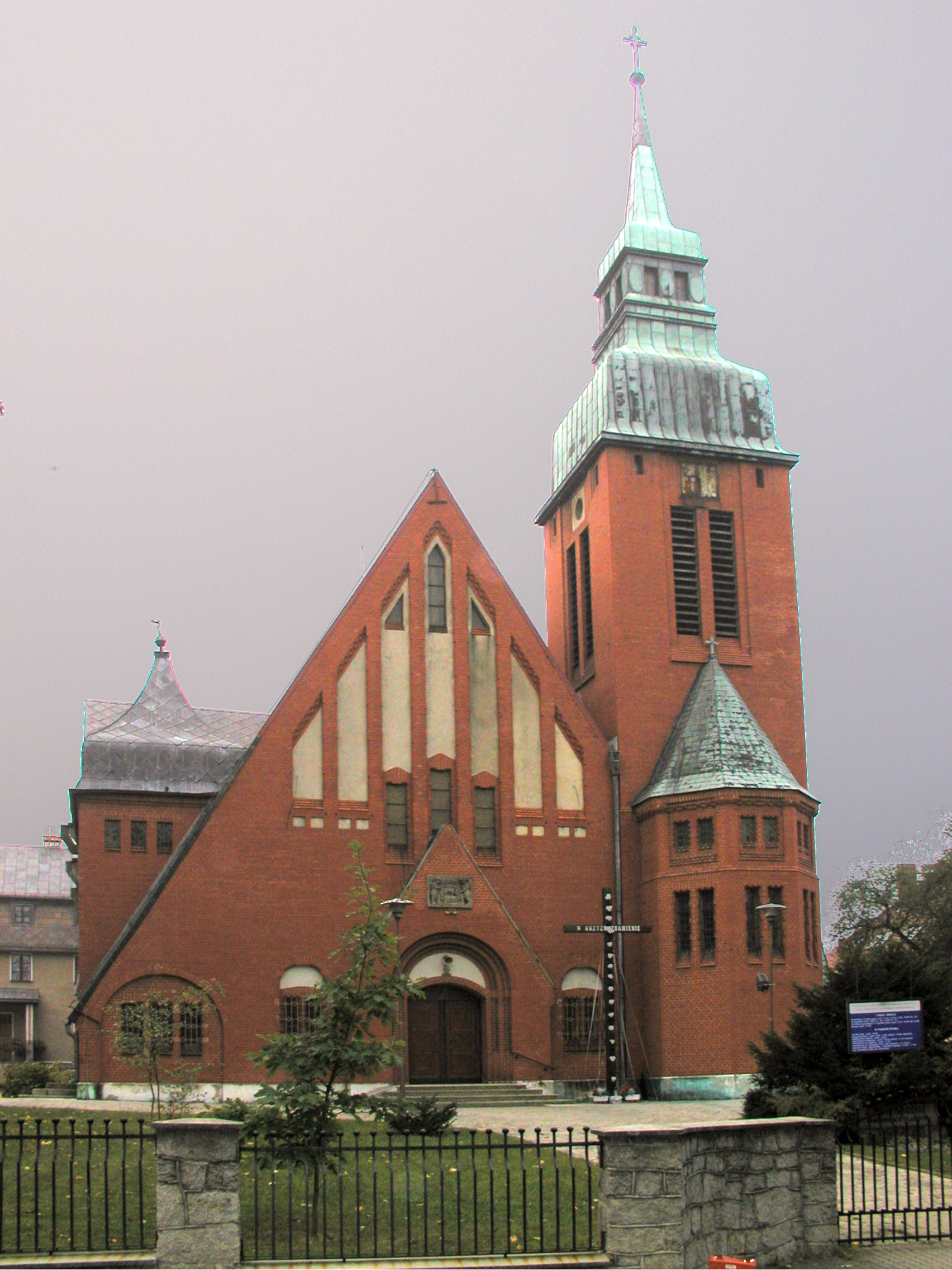
St. Jude Thaddeus church

Karl Eduard von Holtei lived in Obernigk for a few years and married Luise Rogée there in 1821. He described the town in his poems. Because of its good climate in the Katzengebirge (Trzebnickie Hills), Obernigk began to develop from a provincial village into the spa Bad Obernigk under the guidance of the landowner Carl Wolfgang Schaubert in 1835.

In 1856 the town was located along the railway line between Breslau (Wrocław) and Posen (Poznań). When cholera broke out in Breslau in 1866, many inhabitants fled to Obernigk. The town became part of the Prussian-led German Empire in 1871.

Until the end of World War II, Bad Obernigk was part of Landkreis Trebnitz in the Province of Lower Silesia, Germany. Because of its spas and sanatoriums, it was popular with the citizens of Breslau and other cities in Lower Silesia.

Near the end of World War II, in January 1945, the Germans evacuated most of the settlement's population, and most of the remaining residents were recruited into the Volkssturm. The settlement was captured by the Soviets in late January 1945. According to local Poles, only three buildings were destroyed in battle, and more were destroyed and burned down by the Soviet troops later on. The settlement was transferred from Germany to Poland in 1945 and had its remaining German-speaking population expelled in accordance with the Potsdam Agreement; it received town privileges in the same year.

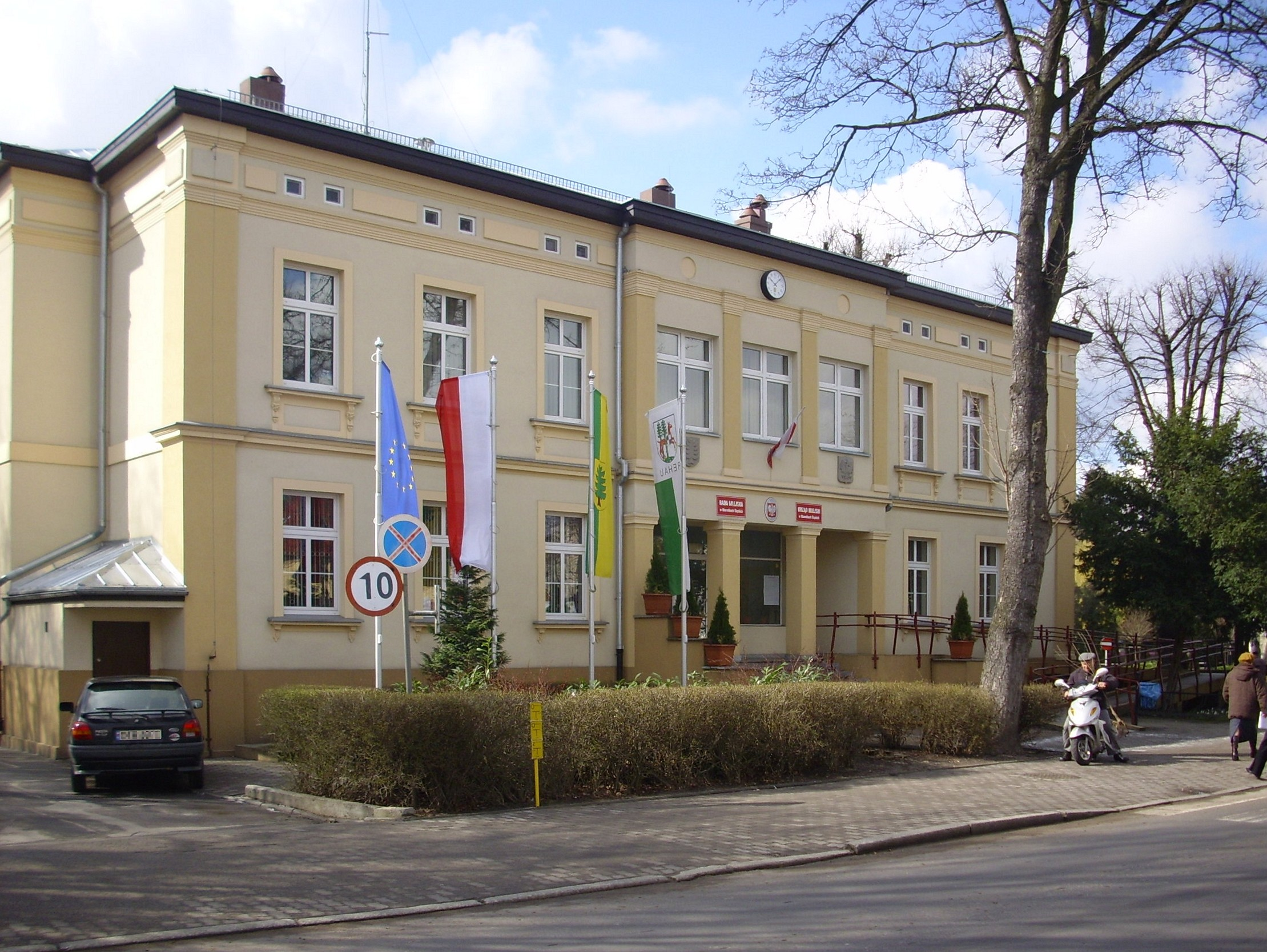
Town hall

== Flag and Coat of Arms ==
The coat-of-arms of the city is a green fir with a brown trunk on a yellow background. The fir, a common tree for this area, is also a symbol referring to the historic character of Karl Eduard von Holtei, a German poet who lived here, and planted such trees in his garden to celebrate birth of his two children. The fir was stamped with postmarks yet before the World War, but as a coat of arms was approved just in 1991. The flag of the city was approved by the Heraldic Commission, and has been the official emblem of Oborniki Śląskie since June 2002. It presents the city's coat-of-arms on a green and yellow background.

== Sights ==
The town's sights and tourist destinations include sanatoria, historic churches of the Sacred Heart of Jesus and of St. Jude Thaddeus and the Grzybek Landscape Park.

== Transport ==
Oborniki Śląskie lies on the intersection of vovoideship roads 342 and 340.

Oborniki Śląskie has a station on the Poznań-Wrocław railway line.

== Notable people ==
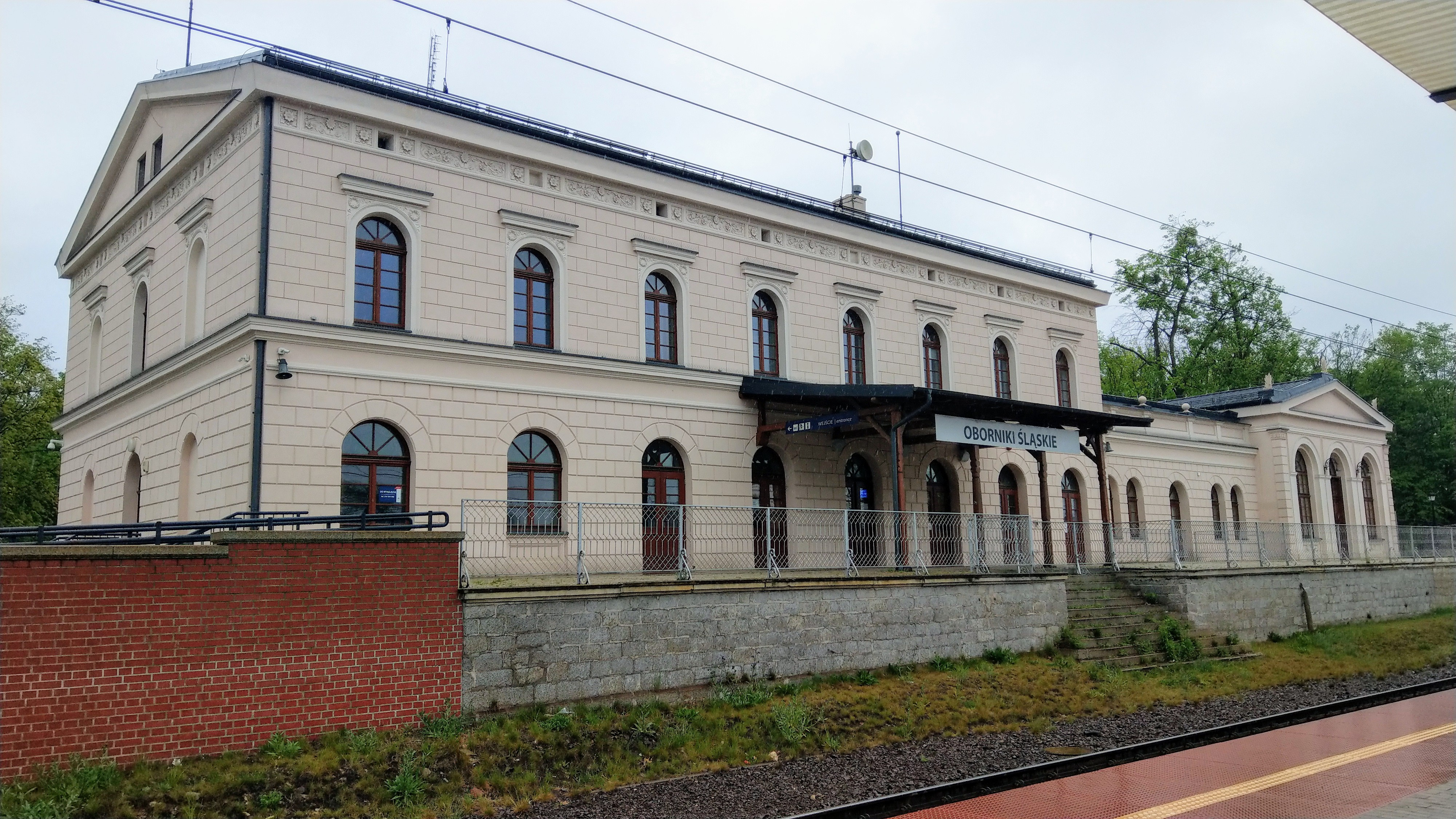
Train station

- Kurt Wünsche (1929-2023), German politician
- Bronisław Komorowski (born 1952), President of Poland from 2010 to 2015
