= Paniowice =

- Village
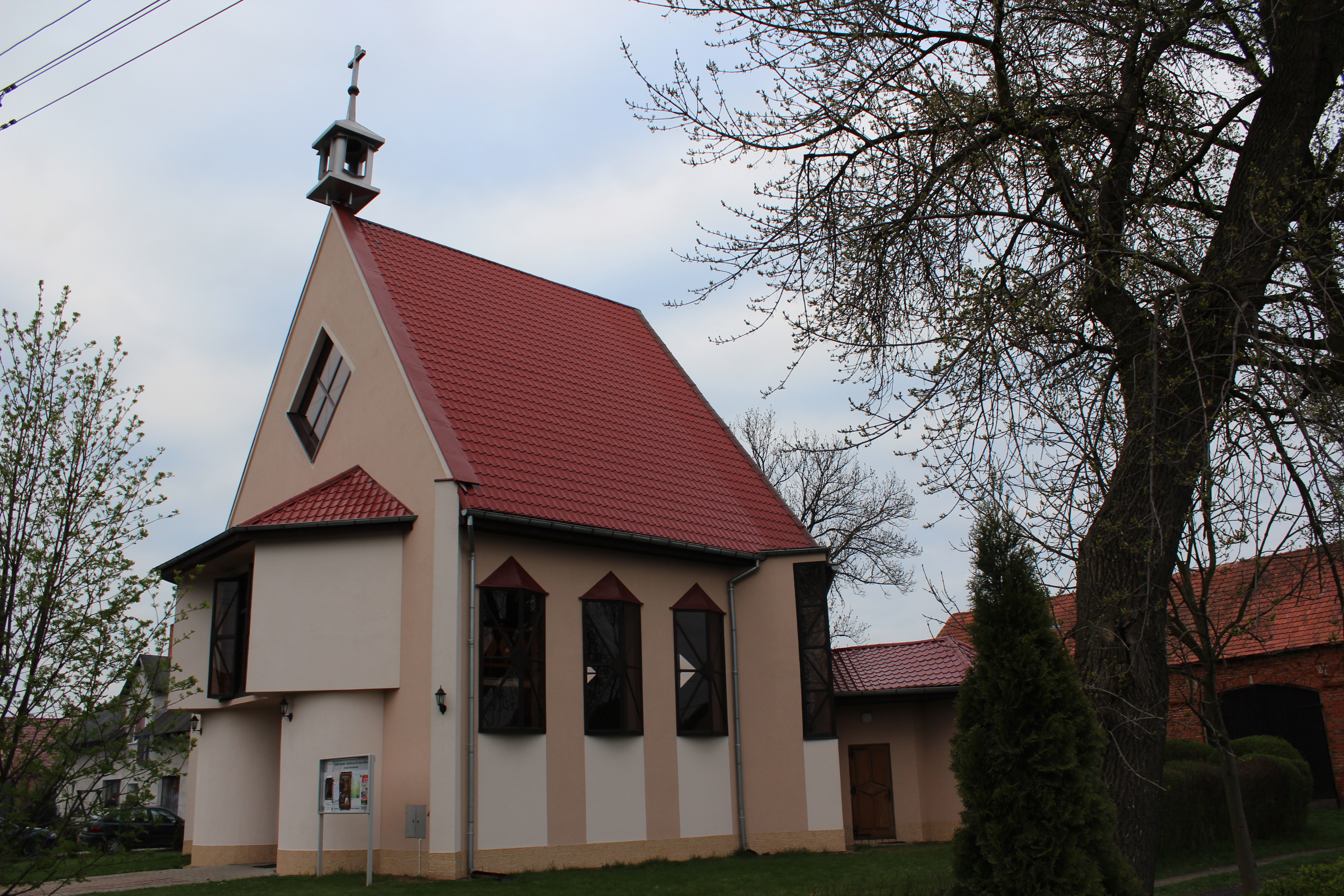
- Divine Mercy Church in Paniowice

- Location within Poland
- Coordinates: 51°12′45″N 16°56′27″E
- Country: Poland
- Voivodeship: Lower Silesian
- County: Trzebnica
- Gmina: Oborniki Śląskie
- Population: 400

Paniowice [paɲɔˈvit͡sɛ] is a village in the administrative district of Gmina Oborniki Śląskie, within Trzebnica County, Lower Silesian Voivodeship, in south-western Poland.
