= Raków, Trzebnica County =

Raków
- Village
- Location within Poland
- Coordinates: 51°14′07″N 16°53′01″E
- Country: Poland
- Voivodeship: Lower Silesian
- County: Trzebnica
- Gmina: Oborniki Śląskie
- Time zone: UTC+1 (CET)
  - Summer (DST): UTC+2 (CEST)
- Vehicle registration: DTR

Raków [ˈrakuf] is a village in the administrative district of Gmina Oborniki Śląskie, within Trzebnica County, Lower Silesian Voivodeship, in south-western Poland.

The name of the village is of Polish origin and comes from the word rak, which means "crayfish".
