= Morzęcin Wielki =

- Village
- Location within Poland
- Coordinates: 51°19′40″N 16°53′57″E
- Country: Poland
- Voivodeship: Lower Silesian
- County: Trzebnica
- Gmina: Oborniki Śląskie

Morzęcin Wielki (Polish pronunciation: [mɔˈʐɛɲtɕin ˈvjɛlkʲi]) is a village in the administrative district of Gmina Oborniki Śląskie, within Trzebnica County, Lower Silesian Voivodeship, in south-western Poland.
