= Zajączków, Lower Silesian Voivodeship =

Zajączków
- Village
- Location within Poland
- Coordinates: 51°14′18″N 16°56′23″E
- Country: Poland
- Voivodeship: Lower Silesian
- County: Trzebnica
- Gmina: Oborniki Śląskie

Zajączków [zaˈjɔnt͡ʂkuf] is a village in the administrative district of Gmina Oborniki Śląskie, within Trzebnica County, Lower Silesian Voivodeship, in south-western Poland.
