= Kowale, Lower Silesian Voivodeship =

Kowale
- Village
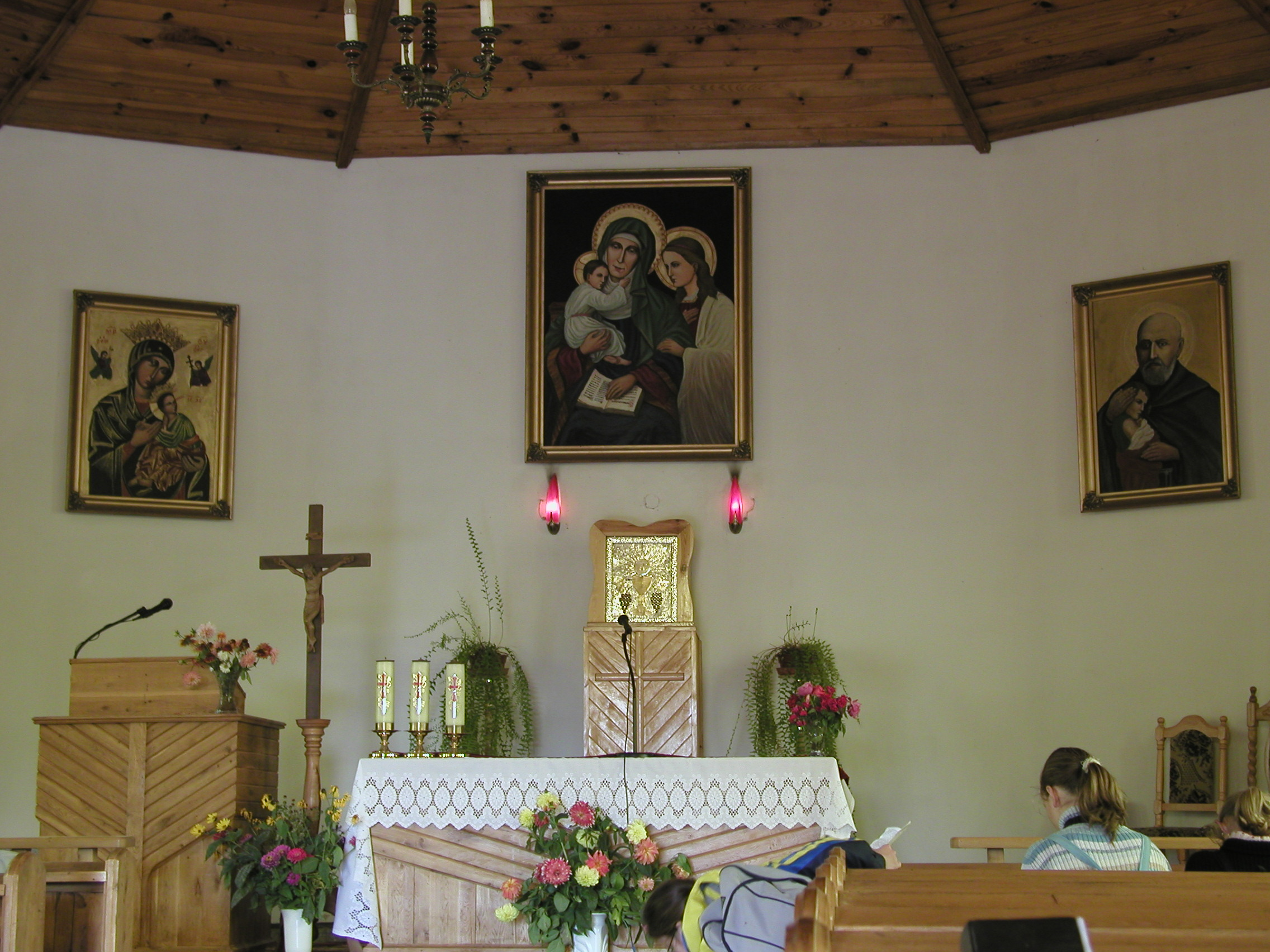
- Inside a chapel in Kowale

- Location within Poland
- Coordinates: 51°17′57″N 16°58′14″E
- Country: Poland
- Voivodeship: Lower Silesian
- County: Trzebnica
- Gmina: Oborniki Śląskie

Kowale [kɔˈvalɛ] is a village in the administrative district of Gmina Oborniki Śląskie, within Trzebnica County, Lower Silesian Voivodeship, in south-western Poland.
