= Uraz, Lower Silesian Voivodeship =

Uraz
- Village
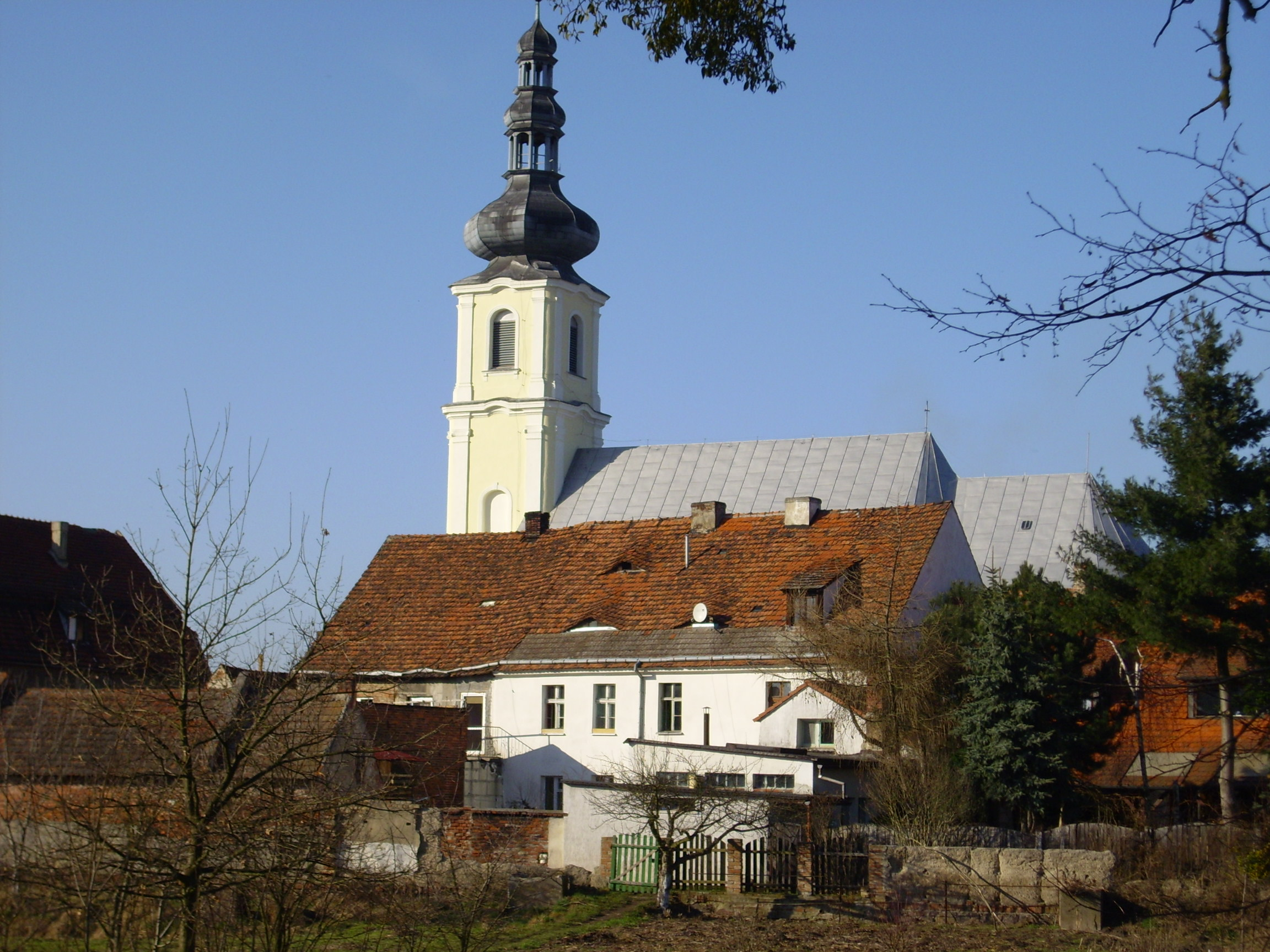
- Uraz and the Church of Archangel Michael

- Coat of arms

- Location within Poland
- Coordinates: 51°15′N 16°51′E
- Country: Poland
- Voivodeship: Lower Silesian
- County: Trzebnica
- Gmina: Oborniki Śląskie
- Population (2011): 949
- Time zone: UTC+1 (CET)
  - Summer (DST): UTC+2 (CEST)
- Vehicle registration: DTR

Uraz [ˈuras] is a village (former town) in the administrative district of Gmina Oborniki Śląskie, within Trzebnica County, Lower Silesian Voivodeship, in south-western Poland.

== Landmarks ==
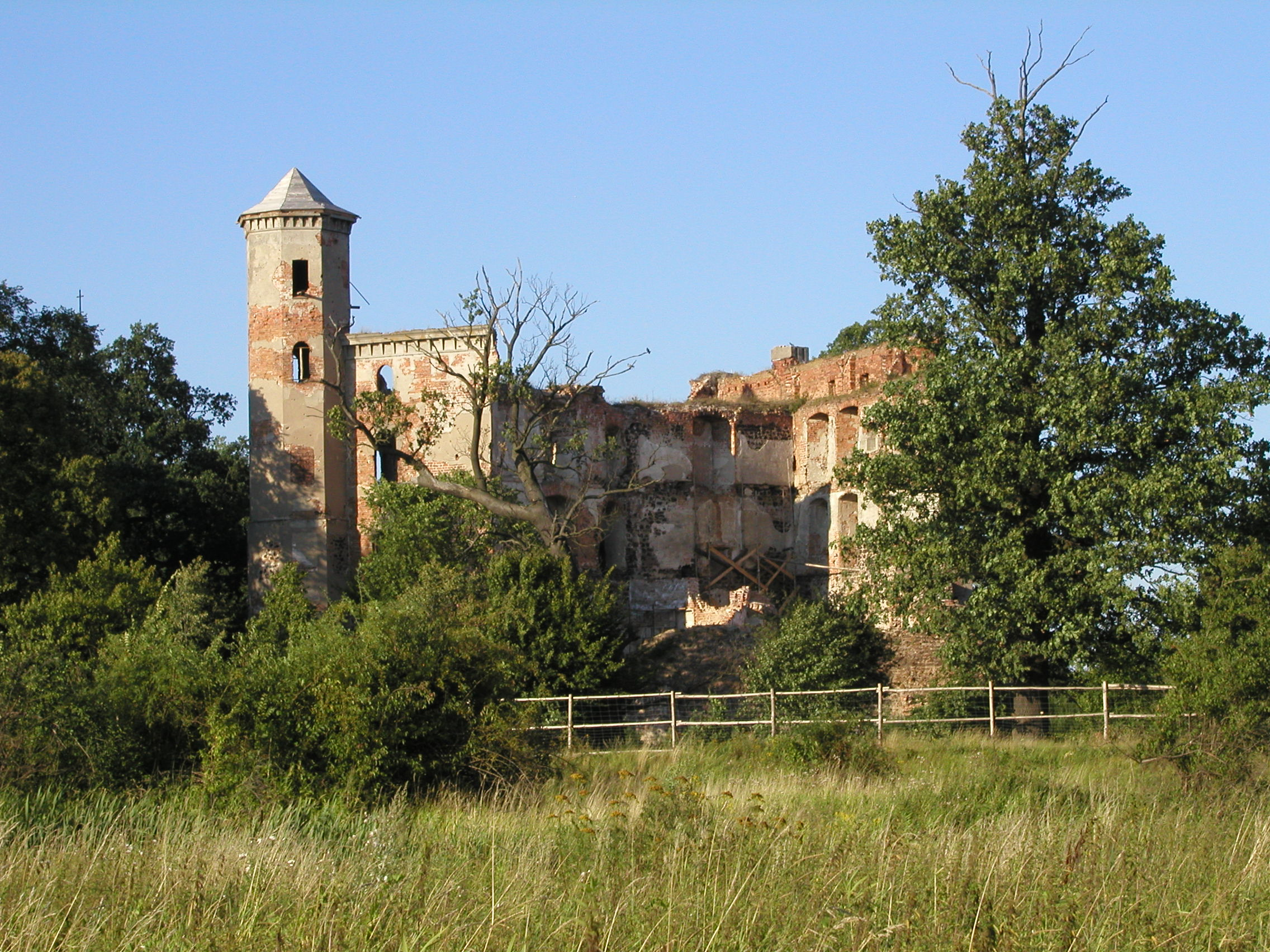
The Castle ruins

The main church, the Church of Archangel Michael, was mentioned in 1218. The present church was built in 1750–1789 in the Baroque style. It was restored in the 19th century, but burned down in 1945. It was subsequently rebuilt in 1951-1953 by the priest Franciszek Dorżyński. In 1970 a new interior with polychrome was added. In 1997, the church was flooded to a height of 40 cm. In the years 1997–2000 it was renovated. In the church there are sculptures brought by repatriates from Navaria, near Lviv. There are the ruins of the Uraz Castle, dated to 1319, which was destroyed by the 1950s.
