= Gregh =

Gregh is a surname. Notable people with the surname include:

- Fernand Gregh (1873–1960), French poet and literary critic
- François-Didier Gregh (1906–1992), Monegasque politician
- Louis Gregh (1843–1915), French composer and music publisher

== See also ==
- Gregg (surname)
