= Niziny, Lower Silesian Voivodeship =

Niziny
- Village
- Location within Poland
- Coordinates: 51°15′46″N 16°51′11″E
- Country: Poland
- Voivodeship: Lower Silesian
- County: Trzebnica
- Gmina: Oborniki Śląskie

Niziny [niˈʑinɨ] is a village in the administrative district of Gmina Oborniki Śląskie, within Trzebnica County, Lower Silesian Voivodeship, in south-western Poland.
