= Comic Book Resources =

Pop culture website

CBR

- Screenshot of CBR homepage in August 2023
- Former name: Comic Book Resources (1995–2016)
- Website type: Pop culture
- Available in: English
- Headquarters: Saint-Laurent, Quebec
- Owner: Valnet
- Creator: Jonah Weiland
- Website: www.cbr.com
- Launched: 1995; 31 years ago
- Current status: Online

CBR, formerly Comic Book Resources, is a news website primarily covering comic book news, comic book reviews, and comic book–related topics involving movies, television, anime, and video games. It is owned by Valnet, parent of publications including Screen Rant, Collider, MovieWeb, and XDA Developers.

== History ==
Comic Book Resources (CBR) was founded by Jonah Weiland in 1995 as a development of the Kingdom Come Message Board, a message forum that Weiland created to discuss DC Comics' then-new mini-series of the same name.

=== Acquisition by Valnet ===
Relaunched logo used between 2016 and 2023

By April 4, 2016, CBR was sold to Valnet Inc., a Montreal, Canada–based company that owns other media properties including Screen Rant. The site was relaunched as CBR.com on August 23, 2016, with the blogs integrated into the site. Popverse reported that following the acquisition by Valnet "comics were increasingly sidelined for coverage [...], as were both reviews and columns as focuses for publishing; instead, the site refocused on shorter news pieces and reactions to news stories". Valnet Inc. is a subsidiary of Valsef Group, which is also headquartered in Montreal.

=== Firings and staff turmoil ===
Adam Swiderski, CBR's editor-in-chief since July 2022, along with "senior news editor Stephen Gerding after 18 years with CBR and senior features editor Christopher Baggett after eight years" were laid off by Valnet in May 2023. Heidi MacDonald, for The Beat, reported that Swiderski, Gerding and Baggett were removed for "standing up for writers" and "pushing back against" changes Valnet instituted. MacDonald wrote that "writers were being asked to do more work while shrinking the pay-per-view rates. The situation was described to me by one person as 'working writers to the bone', saying "The situation is so dire that in addition to the three editors, I'm told two HR people were laid off, who also objected to the demands that management was making on writers, who, as a reminder, are contractors, not employees". Graeme McMillan, for Popverse, commented that Valnet's culture does not permit "its contributors and employees to question corporate decree" which has led to layoffs of people who have spoken out "about potential issues over Valnet's management and business practices" at CBR and other Valnet-owned sites.

In June 2023, McMillan of Popverse reported that there was a continuing "editorial exodus" at CBR. In August 2023, Rich Johnston of Bleeding Cool commented that there appears to be "serious internal tensions" at CBR and highlighted that former CBR Comics News Editor Sean Gribbin stated between May and August ten News Editors have either left CBR or been laid off. Johnston reported that CBR Managing Editor Jon Arvden pushed back on speculation that CBR was eliminating its news section.

== Reception ==
In 2008, the University at Buffalo's research library described CBR as "the premiere comics-related site on the Web."

In April 2013, comics writer Mark Millar said he read the site every morning after reading the Financial Times.

In 2014, an article by guest author Janelle Asselin criticized the cover of DC Comics's Teen Titans, leading to harassment of and personal threats against Asselin in the website's community forums. Weiland issued a statement apologizing for the incident, condemning the way some community members had reacted, and rebooted the forums in order to establish new ground rules.

Heidi MacDonald, for The Beat in June 2023, commented that after CBR was purchased by Valnet in 2016 it "gradually became a more generic 'content farm' turning out less and less comics content and more and more listicles and inane click-baity articles".

== Awards ==
- 1999, 2000, 2001: Won the "Favourite Comics-Related Website (professional)" Eagle Award.
- 2004, 2005, 2006, 2007, 2008: Nominated for the "Favourite Comics-Related Website" Eagle Award.
- 2009: Won the "Best Comics-Related Periodical/Journalism" Eisner Award.
- 2010, 2011: Won the "Favourite Comics-Related Website" Eagle Award.
- 2011: Won the "Best Comics-Related Periodical/Journalism" Eisner Award.
- 2013: Won the "Best Biographical, Historical or Journalistic Presentation" Harvey Award for its Robot 6 blog.
- 2014: Won the "Best Comics-Related Periodical/Journalism" Eisner Award.
- 2021: Nominated for "Best Comics-Related Website/Publication Tripwire Awards.
