= Joe Asselin =

American singer

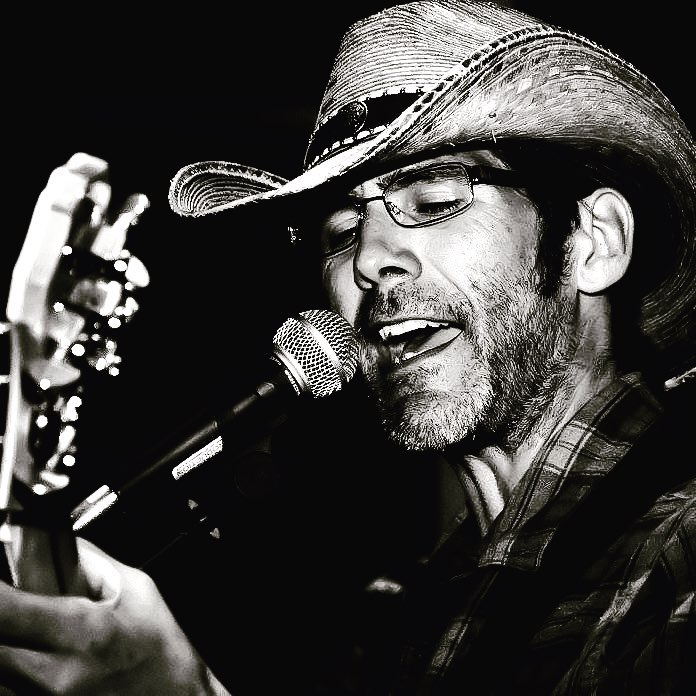

Background information
- Born: 1977 (age 48–49); Manchester, New Hampshire, United States
- Genres: Chicago blues, electric blues, country blues, rockabilly, folk, country
- Occupations: Guitarist, harmonicist, singer, songwriter
- Instruments: Guitar, piano, lap steel, resonator guitar, harmonica, vocals
- Years active: 1998–present
- Labels: Blue Bella Records (with Kilborn Alley Blues Band), independent

Joe Asselin (born 1977, Manchester, New Hampshire, United States) is an American Chicago blues and electric blues musician based out of Champaign, Illinois. He has appeared on five releases with the Blues Music Award-nominated Kilborn Alley Blues Band, with three of them being produced by fellow blues musician Nick Moss at his Blue Bella Records label. He was also a part of the International Blues Challenge finalist group the Sugar Prophets from 2011 to 2013. More recently he has worked with several other Champaign-based local blues, rock, and country bands and released his own solo acoustic album Blue Genes in 2016.

== Biography ==
Asselin originally learned how to play keyboards and harmonica when he was eight years old. While living in Litchfield, New Hampshire, he supposedly picked up the harmonica after stealing one out of his older brother Mark's glove box in his car. Music was a large part of his early family life. His brother Mark worked for the alternative band Cold as their guitar tech throughout the 1990s and also plays guitar.

Before moving to Illinois, Asselin played with the short-lived American Folk Project as the singer, harmonica player, and acoustic guitar player. After turning 22, Asselin came to Illinois in search of playing blues music. He connected with the Kilborn Alley Blues Band in Champaign in 1998 and began playing shows around the area. By 2001, the band had secured its first recording session, a live session at Urbana's WEFT radio station. In 2003, after some major regional success, Kilborn Alley put their first release proper, the eponymous Kilborn Alley Blues Band on local label PeeDee Records. The band's version of Johnny "Guitar" Watson's "Too Tired" single found its way to local blues jukeboxes as far north as Chicago. The album and the band's few gigs into some small South and West Side Chicago clubs brought them to the attention of Nick Moss. Prior to the release of the band's first major record, Asselin was nearly killed in a rear-end accident by a semi truck on Interstate 57 outside of Champaign. He went on to make a full recovery and resume playing with Kilborn Alley in 2006.

Moss produced the band's 2006 Blues Music Award-nominated release Put It in the Alley on his Blue Bella label. Asselin contributed 12 songwriting credits and harmonica to all the tracks. Asselin was also a part of the band's 2007 BMA-nominated follow-up Tear Chicago Down, in which he once again contributed songwriting and harmonica efforts. By 2010, Asselin began taking on a lesser role in the band but still appeared as the featured harmonica player on the second-to-last release on Blue Bella for Moss, entitled Better Off Now. By the end of 2010, Asselin had left the band permanently to pursue full-time a small business in landscaping.

By early 2011, Asselin found himself playing the occasional small acoustic shows around Champaign and Urbana, Illinois. He had long been acquainted with fellow local harmonica player and vocalist Josh Spence. Spence had begun putting together a project that was more of a mixture of blues, rock, and jam band music. Spence's guitarist for the project was moving out of state, and Asselin was asked to join as a guitar player. Asselin joined the band and immediately found success again both locally and regionally. In January 2011, shortly after Asselin joined, the band released their eponymous debut to regional and blues radio fanfare. Mixed by Larry Nix at Ardent Studios, the album was a blend of blues, rock, and rhythm & blues. Asselin contributed songwriting and arrangement credits on all twelve of the album's tracks. The record was placed in the top 20 of the Roots Music Report Contemporary Blues Chart and peaked at number 21 on the Living Blues Magazine Radio Charts. The notoriety saw them compete at the International Blues Challenge in Memphis, Tennessee. At the challenge, the band placed in the Top 8 at the finals on the third day of competition, which earned them invitations to play at many blues festivals around the country.

Due to illnesses and scheduling conflicts within the band, Asselin started working solo again after 2013. Local musical relationships again helped Asselin find a home as a guitarist, vocalist and lyricist with a new project with fellow guitarist and vocalist Noah Williams. With some small regional success, Asselin and his new bandmates in the William Marsala Blues Band returned to Memphis to compete in the International Blues Challenge in 2016. In 2019, the William Marsala Blues Band released their first album Stuck In the Blues: Live From Home on May 17. The album was recorded live at Dark Soul Studios in Decatur, Illinois on December 30, 2018, with no overdubs. The session came about due to the band wanting to shoot a professional promotional video for an upcoming show, and went ahead with recording a full-length list of material in the process.

Asselin, through the help of a GoFundMe campaign, also put together the funds to record his solo self-released acoustic debut Blue Genes. Asselin has worked with country artist John David Daily and opened for Eric Paslay. Asselin signed with Nashville Entertainment Weekly Records in June 2018. He went on to release the EP Flat Head Ford in June 2018 to all platforms. Asselin began performing with Champaign-Urbana, Illinois vocalist/guitarist Lindsay Lilly in March 2019 and will be releasing an album in 2020 under the project called The Black Eyed Lillies. The album is set to be recorded at Blackbird Recording Studios in Nashville in January 2020 and has been funded through a GoFundMe campaign. The Black Eyed Lillies have also been selected by the Illinois Central Blues Club as its solo-duo performance representative at the International Blues Challenge in Memphis, Tennessee on January 28-February 1, 2020.

== Discography ==
(with Kilborn Alley Blues Band)

- WEFT Sessions (2001)
- Kilborn Alley Blues Band (2003)
- Put It In the Alley (2006)
- Tear Chicago Down (2007)
- Better Off Now (2010)
- The Tolono Tapes (2017)

(with The Sugar Prophets)

- The Sugar Prophets (2011)

(with the William Marsala Blues Band)

- Stuck in the Blues: Live From Home (2018)

solo

- Blue Genes (2016)
- Flat Head Ford EP (2018)

== See also ==
- List of Chicago blues musicians
- List of electric blues musicians
