= Przecławice, Trzebnica County =

Village in Lower Silesian Voivodeship, Poland

Przecławice
- Village
- Location within Poland
- Coordinates: 50°55′07″N 16°57′28″E
- Country: Poland
- Voivodeship: Lower Silesian
- County: Trzebnica
- Gmina: Oborniki Śląskie

Przecławice [pʂɛt͡swaˈvit͡sɛ] is a village in the administrative district of Gmina Oborniki Śląskie, within Trzebnica County, Lower Silesian Voivodeship, in south-western Poland.
