= Golędzinów, Trzebnica County =

Golędzinów
- Village
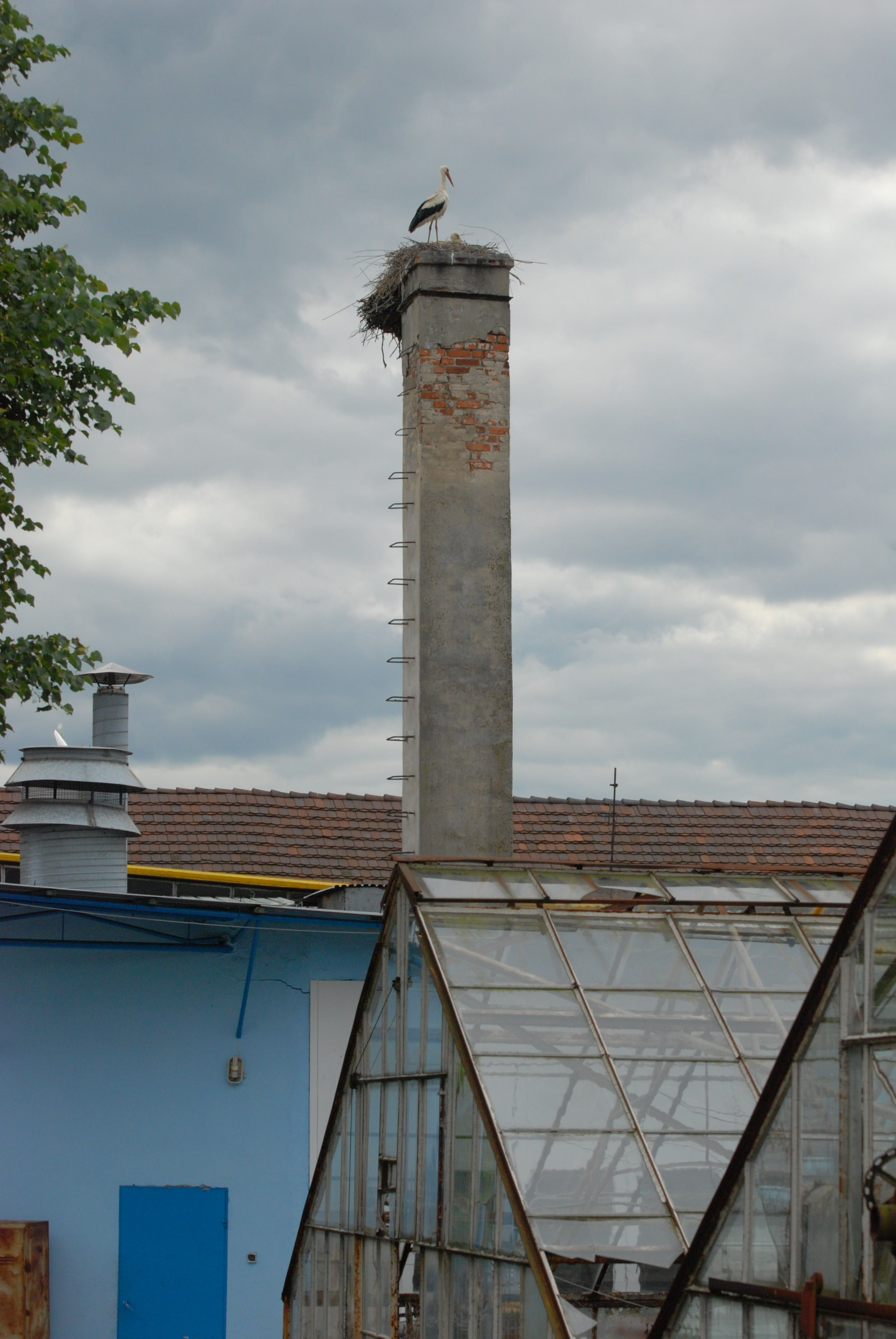
- Gniazdo bocianie w Golędzinowie

- Location within Poland
- Coordinates: 51°16′07″N 16°55′25″E
- Country: Poland
- Voivodeship: Lower Silesian
- County: Trzebnica
- Gmina: Oborniki Śląskie

Golędzinów [ɡɔlɛnˈd͡ʑinuf] is a village in the administrative district of Gmina Oborniki Śląskie, within Trzebnica County, Lower Silesian Voivodeship, in south-western Poland.
