= Marie-Anne Asselin =

Canadian opera singer

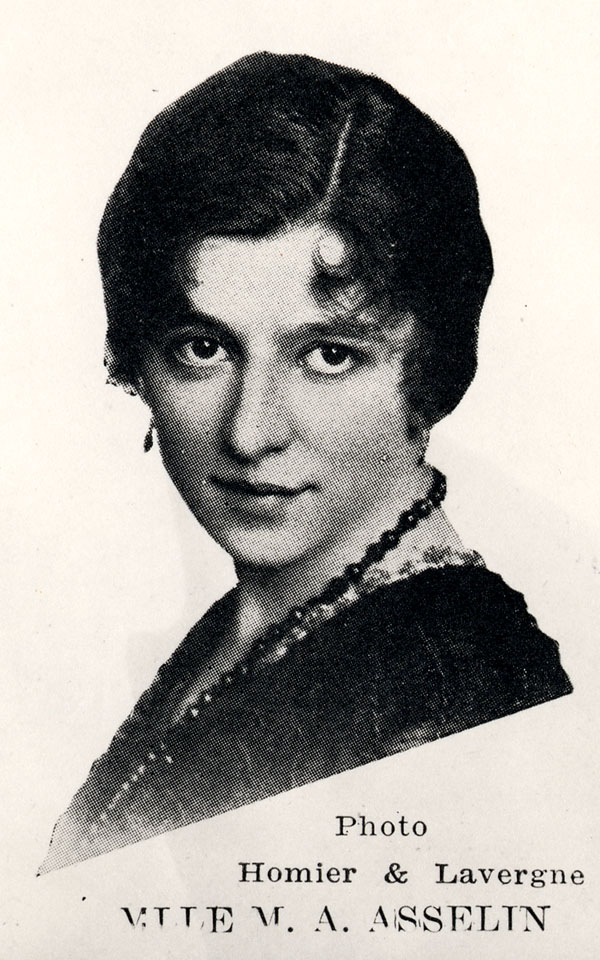
Marie-Anne Asselin

Marie-Anne Asselin (5 September 1888 – 9 March 1972) was a French Canadian mezzo-soprano and voice teacher. She came from a musical family, being the sister of Pierre-Aurèle Asselin.

== Life ==
Asselin was born in the town of Sainte-Famille on l'Île d'Orléans in Quebec Around 1900, she moved with her family to Montreal, where she studied music with Miss Lemire and Béatrice Lapalme.

Asselin made her singing debut on 25 April 1919 in the role of Jeanne in La Basoche by André Messager, which was performed in the Théâtre Français in Montreal. In 1920, Asselin opened a vocal studio on Saint-Denis Street in Montreal. That year she performed many concerts, featuring performances with Émile Gour, Germain Lefevbre, Hercule Lavoie and Blanche Gonthier.

A series of radio performances with José Delaquerrière, Jeanne Maubourg, Blanche Archambault, Germaine Lebel, André Durieux and Maurice Jacquet broadcast on CKAC were also heard in New England, and as a result the group was invited to perform a concert broadcast on a new station in Springfield, Illinois.

She remained a vocal teacher in Montreal for her life, moving studios to Rue Saint Hubert in the 1930s and Saint-Joseph Boulevard East in the 1950s. She died in Montreal on 9 March 1972, aged 83.

== Recordings ==
Asselin made a single recording in her lifetime. Her one 78 RPM record contained the songs Au clavecin and Tes yeux. It was released by the Berliner Gram-o-phone.
