= Bemberg =

Bemberg is a surname. Notable people with the surname include:

- Carlos Miguens Bemberg (born 1949), Argentine businessman
- Herman Bemberg (1859–1931), French musical composer
- María Luisa Bemberg (1922–1995), pioneer feminist, film writer, director and actress born in Buenos Aires, Argentina
- Otto Bemberg (1827–1896), German Argentine businessman prominent in the development of early Argentine industry
- A trade name for cuprammonium rayon, owned by the J. P. Bemberg company.
