= Gmina Oborniki Śląskie =

Gmina Oborniki Śląskie Oborniki Śląskie Commune
- Gmina
- Flag Coat of arms
- Interactive map of Gmina Oborniki Śląskie
- Coordinates (Oborniki Śląskie): 51°17′55″N 16°54′06″E
- Country: Poland
- Voivodeship: Lower Silesian
- County: Trzebnica
- Seat: Oborniki Śląskie
- Sołectwos: Bagno, Borkowice, Golędzinów, Jary, Kotowice, Kowale, Kuraszków, Lubnów, Morzęcin Mały, Morzęcin Wielki, Niziny, Osola, Osolin, Paniowice, Pęgów, Piekary, Przecławice, Raków, Rościsławice, Siemianice, Uraz, Wielka Lipa, Wilczyn Leśny, Zajączków

Area
  - Total: 165.2 km^{2} (63.8 sq mi)

Population (2019-06-30)
  - Total: 20,261
  - Density: 122.6/km^{2} (317.6/sq mi)
  - Urban: 9,099
  - Rural: 11,162
- Website: http://www.oborniki-slaskie.pl

Gmina Oborniki Śląskie is an urban-rural gmina (administrative district) in Trzebnica County, Lower Silesian Voivodeship, in south-western Poland. Its seat is the town of Oborniki Śląskie, which lies approximately 12 kilometres (7 mi) west of Trzebnica, and 22 kilometres (14 mi) north-west of the regional capital Wrocław.

The gmina covers an area of 165.24 square kilometres (63.8 sq mi). As of 2019, its total population was 20,261. It is part of the larger Wrocław metropolitan area.

== Neighbouring gminas ==
Gmina Oborniki Śląskie is bordered by the town of Wrocław and the gminas of Brzeg Dolny, Miękinia, Prusice, Trzebnica, Wisznia Mała and Wołów.

== Villages ==
Apart from the town of Oborniki Śląskie, the gmina contains the villages of Bagno, Borkowice, Brzeźno Małe, Golędzinów, Jary, Kotowice, Kowale, Kuraszków, Lubnów, Morzęcin Mały, Morzęcin Wielki, Niziny, Nowosielce, Osola, Osolin, Paniowice, Pęgów, Piekary, Przecławice, Raków, Rościsławice, Siemianice, Uraz, Wielka Lipa, Wilczyn Leśny and Zajączków.
