= Janelle Asselin =

American comic book editor and writer

Janelle Asselin is an American comic book editor and writer, known for creating the now-defunct publishing company Rosy Press. As of 2023, Asselin works as an editor for American Girl and resides in Madison, Wisconsin.

== Personal life ==
Asselin was born on April 10, 1983, and grew up in Malvern, Iowa, where she attended Malvern Community Junior Senior High School. She later attended Southern New Hampshire University, where she graduated in 2009 with a bachelor's degree in English, and went on to receive a Master's of Science degree in Publishing in 2011 from Pace University.

Asselin has suffered from health issues such as Ehlers–Danlos syndrome and fibromyalgia.

== Early career ==
Asselin began working for Newsarama as a pop culture reviewer and eventually moved to Fangoria Graphix, where she performed various tasks such as proofreading and designing layout. After leaving Fangoria Graphix Asselin worked as a line editor and briefly returned to Newsarama before gaining employment with DC Comics in 2008. While at DC Comics Asselin worked on titles such as Batman, Batgirl, and Birds of Prey before leaving to work for Disney Publishing in 2011. Asselin later stated in 2017 that she left DC due to sexual harassment from a fellow employee, Eddie Berganza, and the company's response to complaints filed by her and other female employees.

Asselin was laid off from Disney Publishing in 2013, after which she began investigating the possibility of creating her own publishing company, Rosy Press. Asselin also worked as a senior editor part-time at ComicsAlliance.

=== Hire This Woman ===
Janelle Asselin created "Hire This Woman" while writing for ComicsAlliance. "Hire This Woman" features a female comic artist or writer in order to help promote talented woman in the comic industry. "Hire This Woman" includes women that are up-and-coming newcomers along with more experienced women in the comic industry. Asselin hoped by creating this feature on ComicsAlliance she would be able to help women find more jobs in the comic book industry. Women featured in these articles include Marguerite Sauvage, Janine Frederick, and Aubrey Aiese. Women interviewed by Janelle Asselin were comic book writers, artists, letterers, colorists, cartoonists, and many more careers in the industry.

=== Teen Titans #1 cover review ===
In 2014 Asselin published an editorial piece on comic book and pop culture website CBR, criticizing the cover artwork of the first issue of DC's The New 52 Teen Titans relaunch, specifically highlighting the artwork for Wonder Girl. Asselin criticized the work for what she saw as an unrealistic portrayal of a teenage female body and that Wonder Girl's was drawn inappropriately and disproportionally. After the piece was published, Asselin received multiple threats of rape and other bodily harm as well as derogatory sexual remarks questioning her professionalism and experience in the comic book industry. In response to these threats as well as content that site founder Jonah Weiland described as "a negativity and nastiness that has existed on the CBR forums for too long", the site's forums were closed in favor of a new forum that he hoped would be "inclusive, diverse, accepting and compassionate".

=== Rosy Press and Fresh Romance ===
Asselin launched Rosy Press with the hope that she would be able to revive the genre of romance comics. The company and its flagship anthology series, Fresh Romance, was funded via a successful Kickstarter campaign. Asselin recruited several of her colleagues to work on the series, including Kate Leth, Arielle Jovellanos, and Sarah Winifred Searle. The first volume of Fresh Romance was released in May 2015 as digital content and was followed up with a print release by Oni Press in 2016. Prior to her announcement in 2016 that she was shuttering Rosy Press due to personal health issues and financial reasons, the Fresh Romance anthology series received nominations for a Dwayne McDuffie Diversity Award and a Harvey Award for Best Anthology.

In November 2016 the Fresh Romance series was picked up by Emet Comics, which also purchased Rosy Press.

After working in marketing for a few years, Asselin was hired as an editor for American Girl, where she has been ever since. She also works as a professional genealogist.
