= Siemianice, Lower Silesian Voivodeship =

Siemianice
- Village
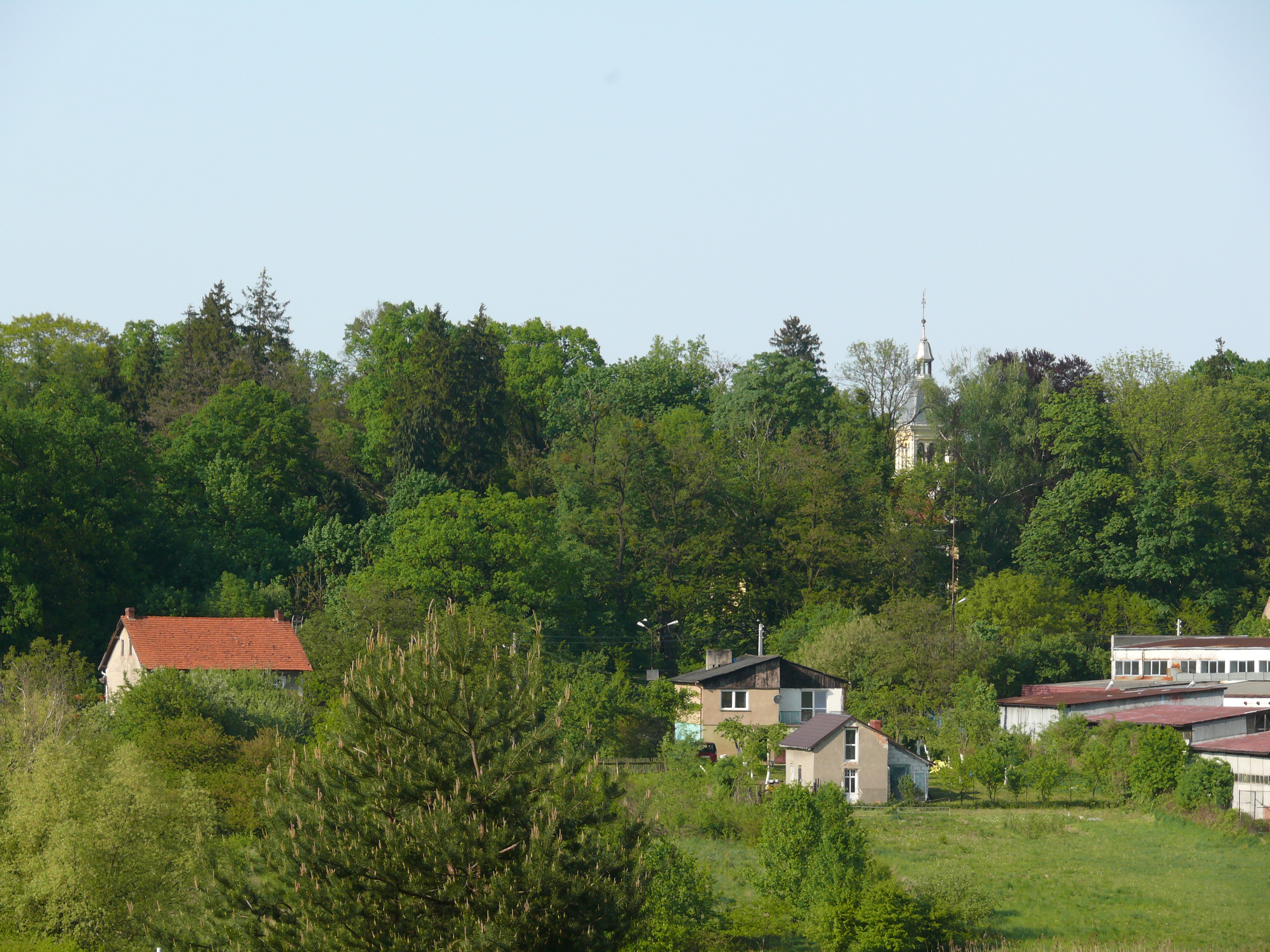

- Location within Poland
- Coordinates: 51°19′15″N 16°54′36″E
- Country: Poland
- Voivodeship: Lower Silesian
- County: Trzebnica
- Gmina: Oborniki Śląskie

Siemianice [ɕɛmjaˈnit͡sɛ] is a village in the administrative district of Gmina Oborniki Śląskie, within Trzebnica County, Lower Silesian Voivodeship, in south-western Poland.
