= Kuraszków, Lower Silesian Voivodeship =

Kuraszków
- Village
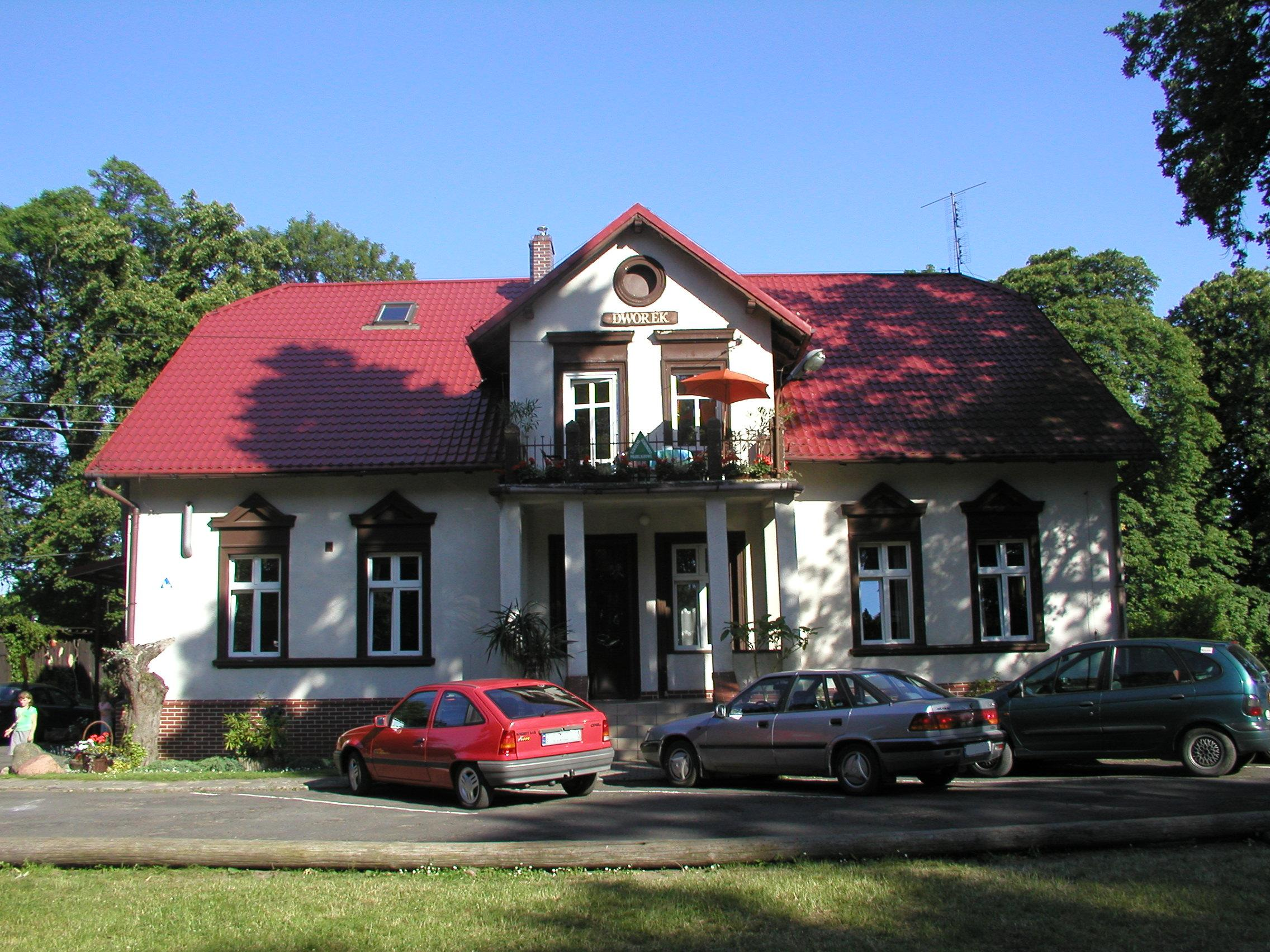

- Location within Poland
- Coordinates: 51°19′N 16°56′E
- Country: Poland
- Voivodeship: Lower Silesian
- County: Trzebnica
- Gmina: Oborniki Śląskie

Kuraszków [kuˈraʂkuf] is a village in the administrative district of Gmina Oborniki Śląskie, within Trzebnica County, Lower Silesian Voivodeship, in south-western Poland.
