= Louis Gregh =

French composer, conductor, and music publisher

Louis Charles Félix François Gregh (16 March 1843 – 21 January 1915) was a French composer, conductor and music publisher.

== Life ==
Gregh was born in Philippeville, now Skikda, Algeria, on 16 March 1843. His family was of Maltese origin. As a composer, he wrote operettas, ballets, numerous popular songs, and over 150 works for piano for two, four, and six hands.

Gregh's first successful stage work was the operetta Un Lycée de jeunes filles which premiered at the Théâtre de Cluny on 28 December 1881 with Gregh conducting. This was followed by the opera bouffe Le Présomptif which was premiered at the Royal Saint-Hubert Galleries in Brussels on 12 December 1883 followed by a staging at the Théâtre de la Renaissance in Paris in 1884.

He died in Sainte Mesme, Seine-et-Oise, now Yvelines, aged 71.

His son Fernand Gregh (1873–1960) was a philosopher, literary critic and poet, member of the Académie française.

== Publishing business ==
Gregh registered as a music publisher with SACEM in February 1873 after having bought the catalogue of the Parisian publisher Claude Heu. He grew by acquiring, by auction, parts of the dissolved publishers Léon Escudier (1882), Egrot (1884), and Jochem (1899). He was also the French representative of the publishers Litolff and Universal Edition. His business was quite successful, and he only gave up in old age in 1907, when he sold it to Rouart, which in turn was taken over by Salabert in 1953.

== Selected compositions ==
Stage works

- Un Lycée de jeunes filles (operetta, 1881)
- Le Présomptif (opera bouffe, 1883)
- Le Capitaine Roland (operetta, 1895)
- Arlette (ballet)

Vocal music

- Le Bon pasteur (L. Capet) (1876)
- La Cage du pinson (Villemer & Delormel) (1876)
- Je n'ai rien osé lui dire. Récit-naïveté (words: A. Queyriaux) (1876)
- La Leçon de charité (Capet & Carel) (1876)
- Lettre d'une pensionnaire (Villemer & Delormel) (1876)
- Minuit à Venise. Barcarola (A. Queyriaux) (1876)
- La Plainte de l'exilé (Villemer & Delormel) (1876)
- Les Roses mortes (Villemer & Delormel) (1876)
- Connaissez-vous mon amie? (Villemer & Delormel) (1877)
- Le Pays du bon vin (Toast à la France) (with choir ad libitum, L. Labarre &. Queyriaux) (1877)
- En troïka! (G. de Loyat & A. Queyriaux) (1878)
- L'Étoile de la France (L. Raimon & J. Dorsay) (1878)
- Fatma. Réponse à la Ballade arabe (Henry Drucker) (1878)
- L'Immensité (Jules Ruelle; Italian translation: Cesare da Prato) (1880)

Piano music

- Danse slave, Op. 1
- En poste. Grand galop di bravura, Op. 2
- Chanson béarnaise, Op. 3
- Le Chant du Séraphin, Op. 4 (1875)
- Les Bergers-Watteau, Op. 5
- 1ère Mazurka de salon, Op. 6
- Grand marche solennelle, Op. 7 (1876)
- Les Joyeux papillons. Capriccio, Op. 8 (1877)
- Élégie-Étude, Op. 9
- Élégie-Pastorale, Op. 10
- Les Farfadets. Scherzo galop, Op. 11
- Pastorale Louis XV, Op. 12 (1878)
- Le Retour des moissonneurs, Op. 13 (1878)
- Perles et Fleurs. 2eme Mazurka brillante du salon, Op. 14
- L'Immensité. Suite de valses, Op. 15
- Rêverie, Op. 16
- Le Chant du souvenir, Op. 17
- L'Oiseau moqueur, Op. 18
- Les Phalènes, Op. 19
- La Mandoline, Op. 20
- Au petit trot, Op. 21
- Aida grande marche (Verdi), transcription, Op. 22
- Bergerette. Pastorale Florian, Op. 23
- Grande valse romantique, Op. 24
- Les Noces d'or, Op. 25
- La Gaditana, Op. 26
- Promenade matinale, Op. 27
- Matinée de mai. Caprice, Op. 28
- Parais à ta fenêtre! Sérénade, Op. 29
- Coquetterie. Air de ballet, Op. 30
- Valse de Salon No. 4, Op. 35
- Je pense à vous. Valse, Op. 42
- Répose, Op. 53
- Fête printanière, Op. 67
- Avant-printemps, Op. 96
- Nuits algériennes, Op. 98
- Voyages en rêve, Op. 108
- Dora. Polka brillante (1877)
- Études de mécanisme et d'expression (1877)
