= Laskowa =

Laskowa may refer to:

- Laskowa, Lower Silesian Voivodeship (south-west Poland)
- Laskowa, Limanowa County in Lesser Poland Voivodeship (south Poland)
- Laskowa, Oświęcim County in Lesser Poland Voivodeship (south Poland)
- Laskowa, Świętokrzyskie Voivodeship (south-central Poland)

== See also ==
- Lasków (disambiguation)
