= Żmigród =

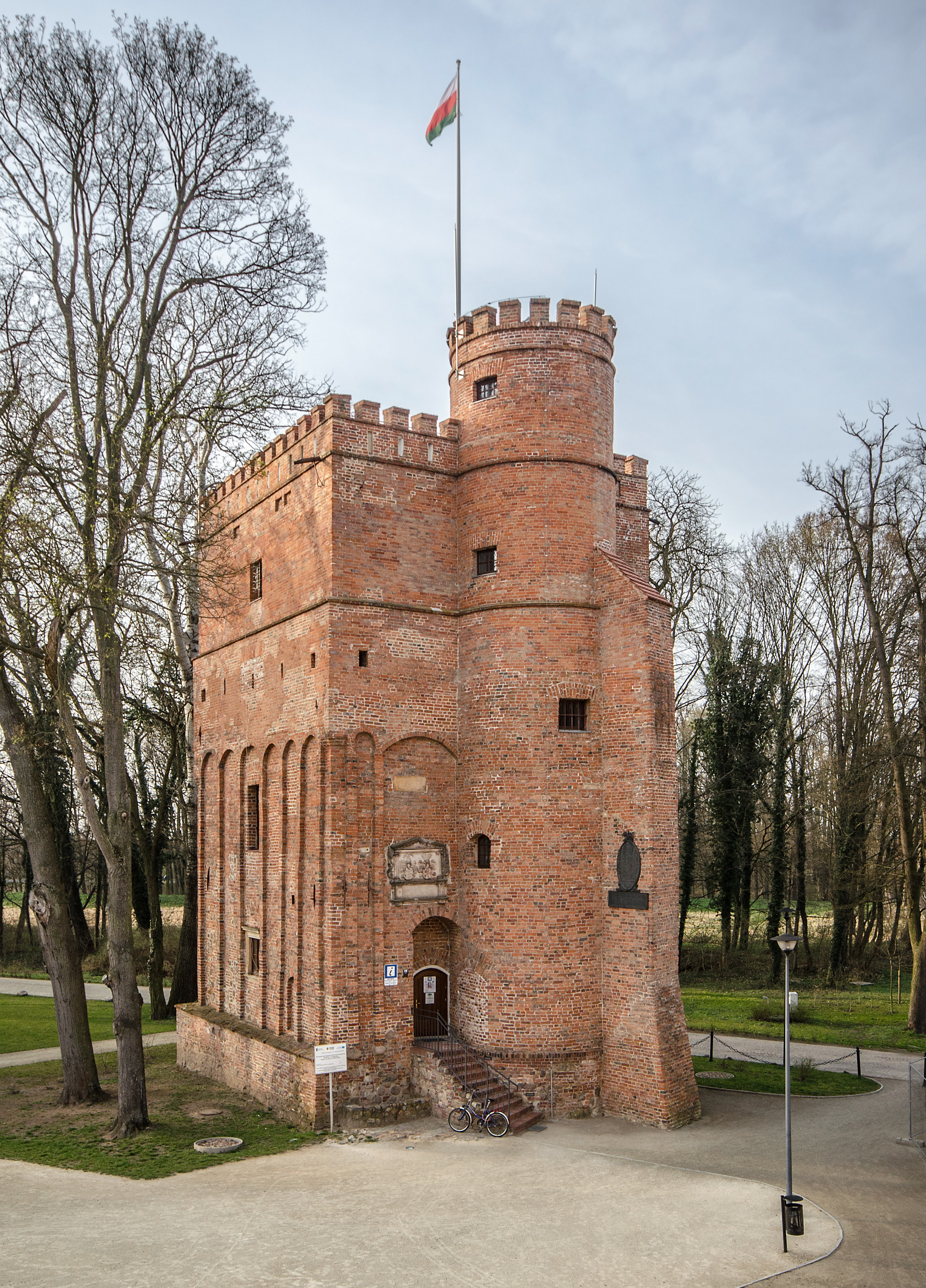
- Castellan Tower

- Flag Coat of arms

- Location within Poland
- Coordinates: 51°28′13″N 16°54′18″E
- Country: Poland
- Voivodeship: Lower Silesian
- County: Trzebnica
- Gmina: Żmigród

Area
  - Total: 9.49 km^{2} (3.66 sq mi)
- Elevation: 150 m (490 ft)

Population (2019-06-30)
  - Total: 6,435
  - Density: 678/km^{2} (1,760/sq mi)
- Time zone: UTC+1 (CET)
  - Summer (DST): UTC+2 (CEST)
- Postal code: 55-140
- Vehicle registration: DTR
- Website: http://www.zmigrod.com.pl

Żmigród [ˈʐmiɡrut] (German: Trachenberg) is a town in Trzebnica County, Lower Silesian Voivodeship, in south-western Poland. It is the seat of the administrative district (gmina) called Gmina Żmigród.

== Geography ==
The town lies in the historic Lower Silesia region on the Barycz River, approximately 22 km (14 mi) north-west of Trzebnica, and 40 km (25 mi) north of the regional capital Wrocław. Its name is derived from Old Polish Żmij, "dragon" (German: Drachen) and gród, "castle" (German: Burg), displayed in the town's coat of arms.

As of 2019, the town had a population of 6,435. It is part of the larger Wrocław metropolitan area.

== History ==
The oldest sources say the settlement existed in the third period of the Bronze Age. The first records of a former Slavic settlement named Zunigrod (present-day Żmigródek) on the north bank of the Barycz River, then held by the Bishop of Wrocław, appear in the library of Pope Adrian IV in 1155. The current city on the other side of the river was invested according to German town law by one Tydricus dictus Deysenberc at the behest of the Piast duke Henry III the White in 1253, in a place where there was a ford. The castle near the border with Greater Poland was fortified, surrounded by a strong palisade, ramparts and a moat, there were built two gates, which were abolished only in 1819. The German name Trachinburg first appeared in 1287. As a result of the fragmentation of Poland, it was part of various Polish duchies of Lower Silesia: the Duchy of Silesia until 1290, the Duchy of Głogów until 1312 and the Duchy of Oleśnica afterwards, held by the Piast dynasty until 1492.

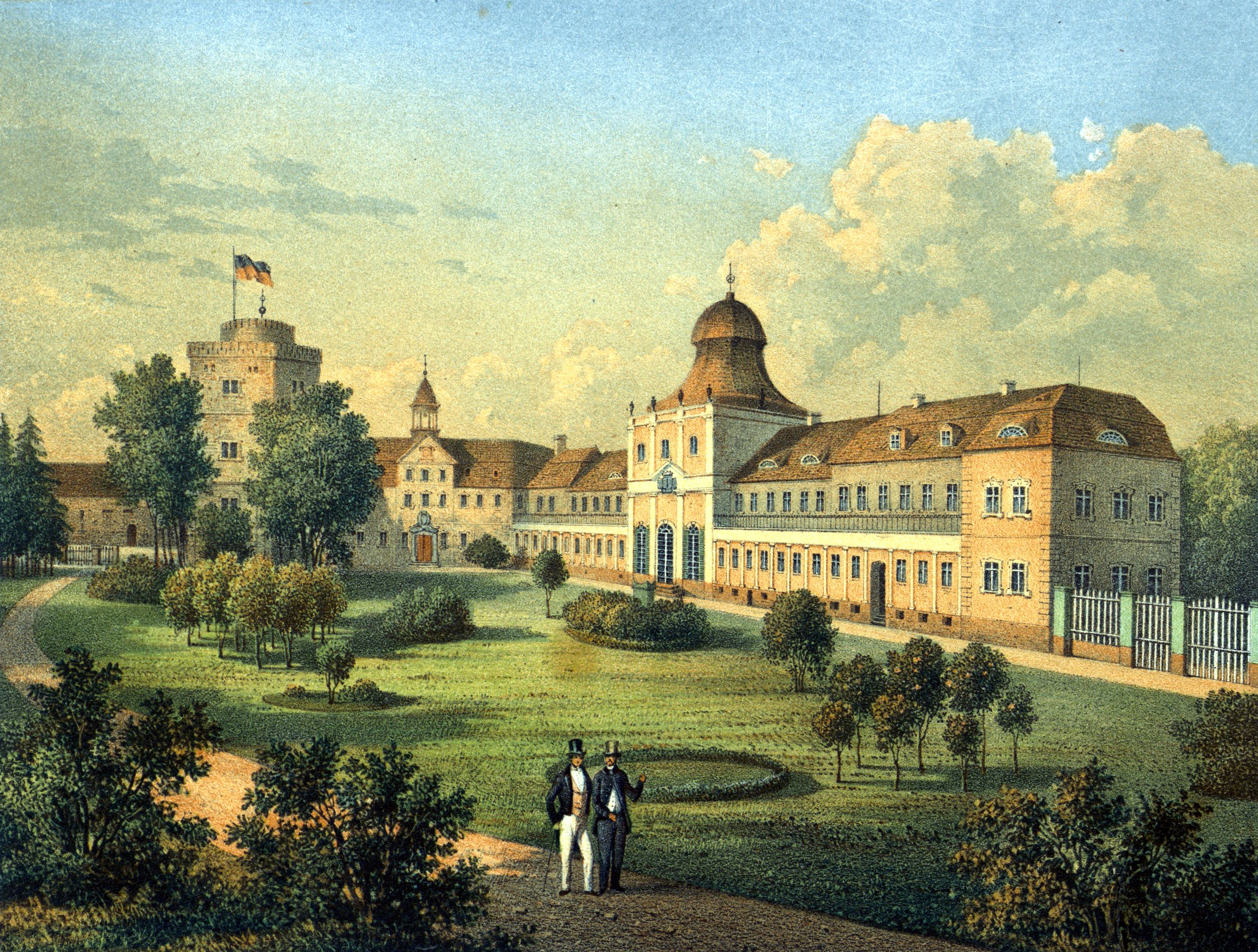
The Hatzfeld Palace c. 1860, edition by Alexander Duncker

In 1492, Trachenberg was elevated to an autonomous state country of the Bohemian Crown. About 1555 the population turned Protestant. After a fire in 1579 a new castle with a tower was built and later upgraded under the rule of the House of Schaffgotsch, who had acquired the estates in 1592. During the Thirty Years' War, the owner Hans Ulrich von Schaffgotsch, a loyal supporter of the assassinated generalissimo Albrecht von Wallenstein was executed in 1635 and his estates seized by Emperor Ferdinand II. Trachenberg Castle was enfeoffed to the Imperial field marshal Count Melchior von Hatzfeldt in 1641. It was besieged several times and finally captured by the Swedish army under the command of General Lennart Torstensson in 1642. The Swedes occupied the castle until 1650. After the war, the area was subjected to stern Counter-Reformation measures. Another expansion of the castle took place in the years 1655–1657 on the initiative of Count Hatzfeld. In 1691, new fortifications were erected.

In the mid-seventeenth century, the Polish-German language boundary ran near Trachenberg, including the city, to the territory of Polish language dominance.

In the mid-18th century the town was annexed by Prussia. During the Napoleonic Wars, the town was captured by Bavarians, the French and Prussians. In 1813, in the baroque palace of the House of Hatzfeld (Princes, 1741, and Dukes of Trachenberg, 1900) there was a meeting of the Prussian king Frederick William III of the Russian Tsar Alexander I, in which the Trachenberg Plan was agreed on, to avoid major battles in the struggle with Napoleon Bonaparte. In the nineteenth century, many Jews settled in the town (then called Trach(t)enberg), however, from the late nineteenth century, they emigrated, mainly to the west, and in 1939 there were no more Jews in the town. The nineteenth-century synagogue was destroyed by the Germans during the Kristallnacht in 1938.

During World War II, the Germans established the 5/111 forced labour camp in the town. The victims of the camp are commemorated by a monument at the local cemetery. On January 23, 1945, the 10th Guards Tank Corps of the 4th Guards Tank Army commanded by General Dmitry Lelyushenko defeated the German garrison of Trachenberg and captured the town. The town was destroyed, except for the castle, which was set afire after the battle. After Germany's defeat in the war, the town under the restored Polish name Żmigród came under Polish administration. End of June 1945, the German population was ordered to leave their home for Germany west of the Oder-Neisse line, in accordance to the Potsdam Agreement. About 20 of the men were interned. Żmigród was repopulated by Poles, many of whom were expelled from former eastern Poland annexed by the Soviet Union. The first transport of Poles from those territories arrived in June 1945 from Vilnius.

Already in 1945 a forestry, a fire brigade and a scout troop were founded. Further establishments include the Piast Żmigród football club in 1946, a cooperative bank in 1950, and a culture centre in 1953. In 1966, Żmigród took part in the nationwide celebrations of the 1000th anniversary of the Baptism of Poland, and in 1980 local workers joined the Solidarity protests. In the 1990s, the Test Track Centre near Żmigród was built as the only railway test track in Poland and one of just eight such facilities in the world. In 2018 a monument commemorating the 100th anniversary of regaining independence by Poland was unveiled.

== Transport ==
Żmigród is bypassed by the S5 expressway to the west. Exit 53 of the expressway provides quick access to Poznań and Wrocław.

Voivodeship road 359 bypasses Żmigród to the east.

Voivodeship road 339 passes right through Żmigród.

Żmigród has a station on the Poznań-Wrocław railway line.

== Notable people ==
- Hermann Goedsche (1815–1878), German author
- Hermann von Hatzfeldt (1848–1933), German civil servant and politician
- Sophie von Hatzfeldt (1805-1881), German socialist and activist
- Ludwig Hartau (1877–1922), German actor

== Twin towns – sister cities ==
See twin towns of Gmina Żmigród.

== Gallery ==
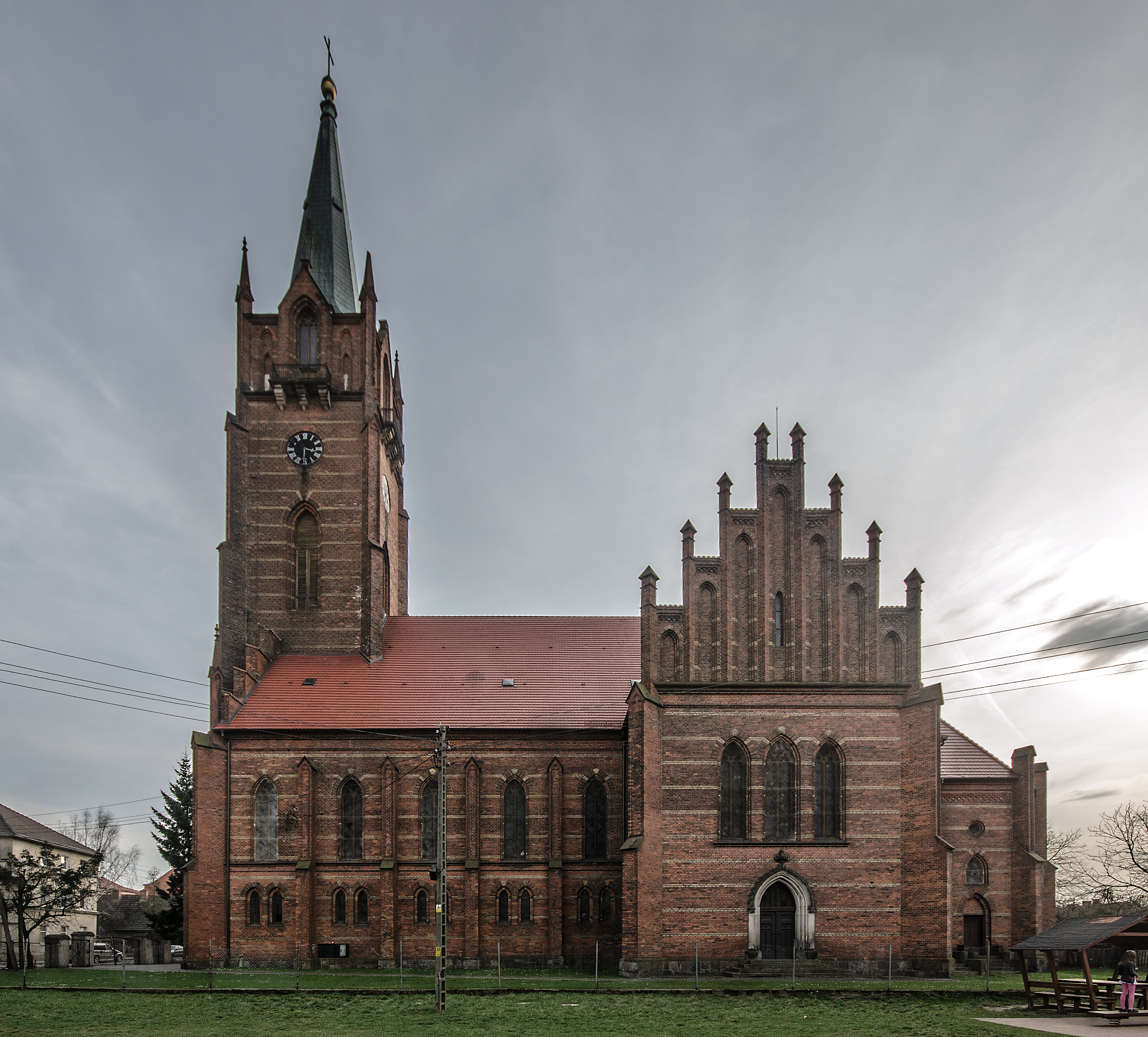
Saint Stanislaus Kostka church

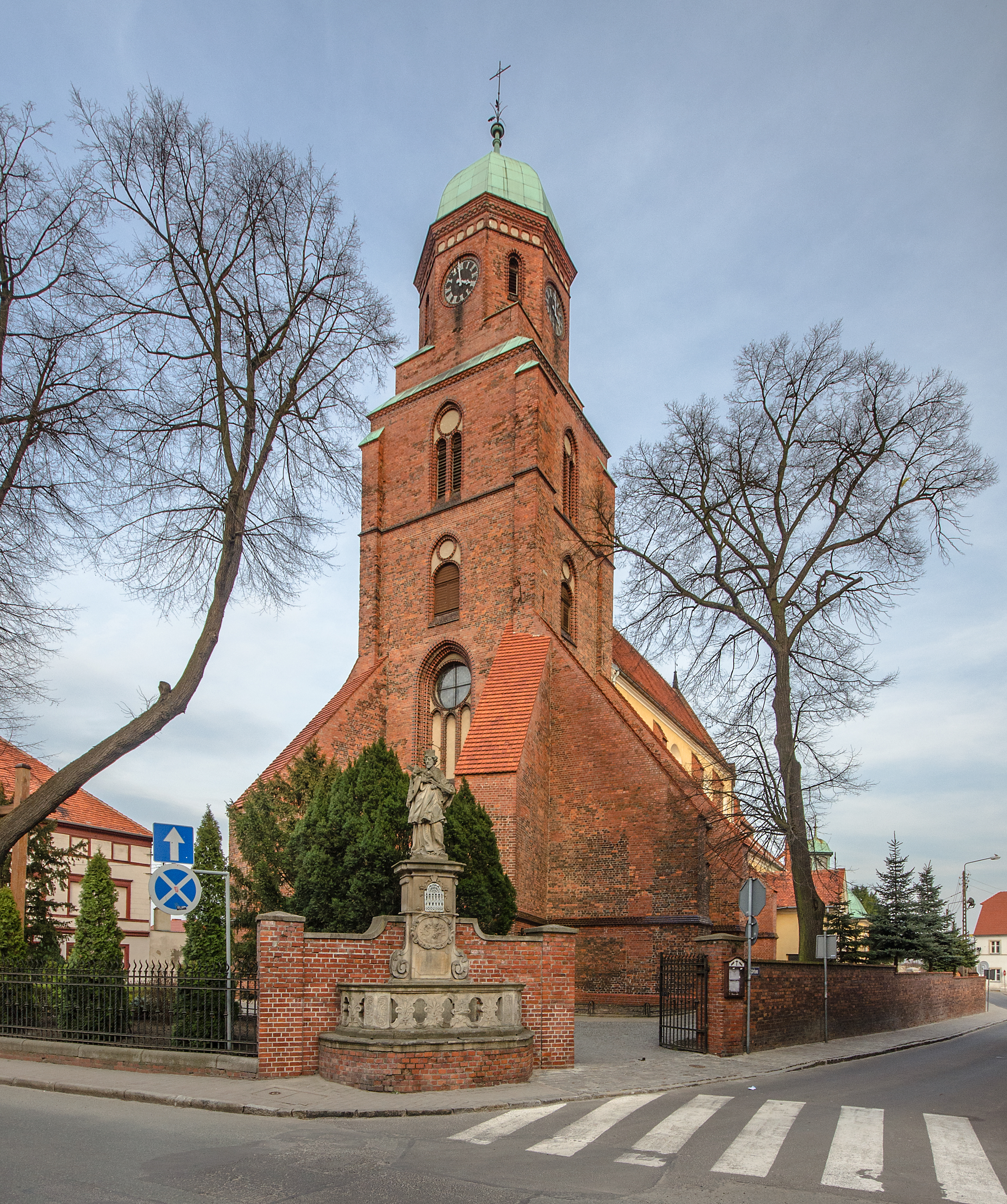
Holy Trinity church

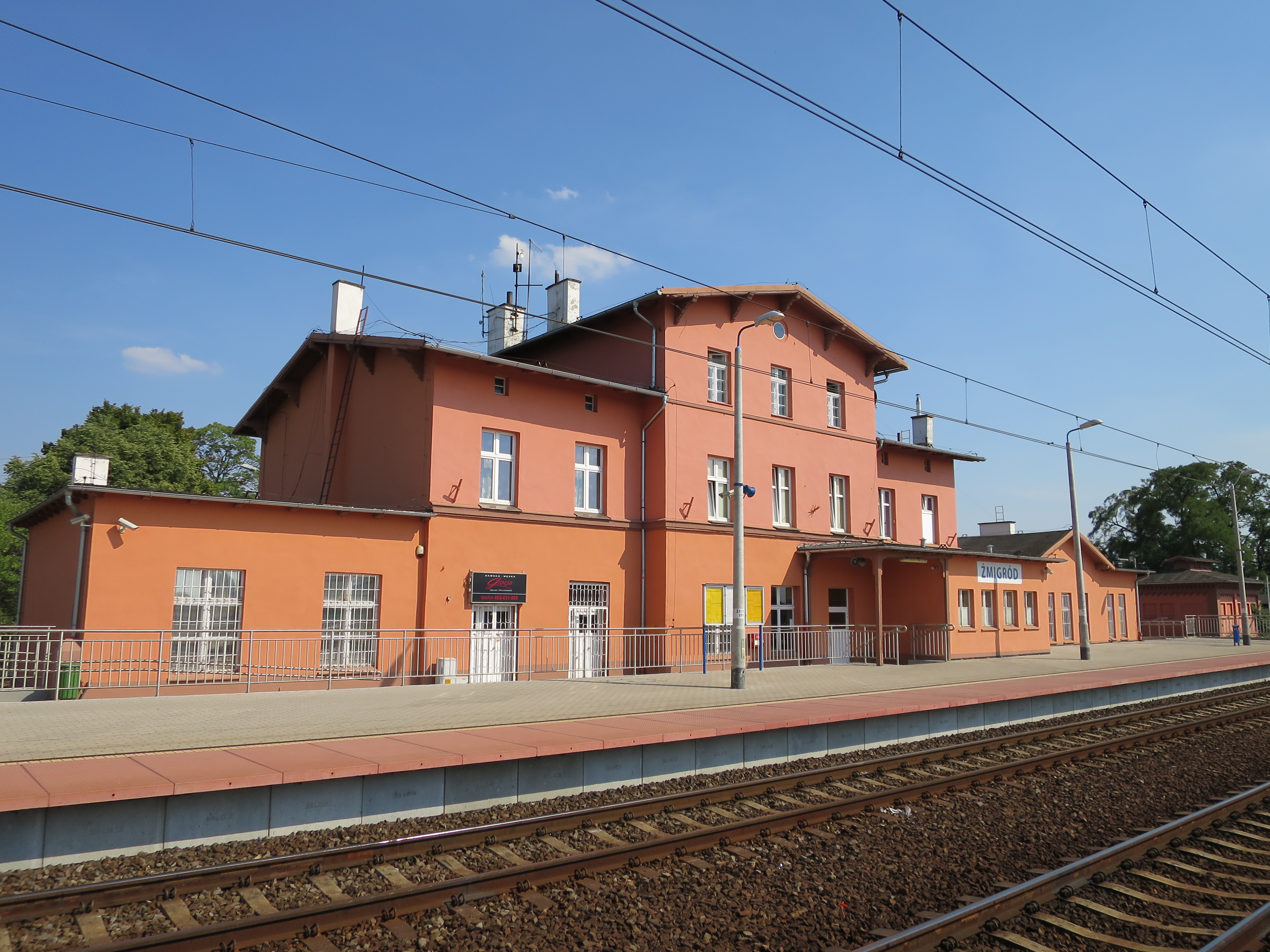
Historic train station

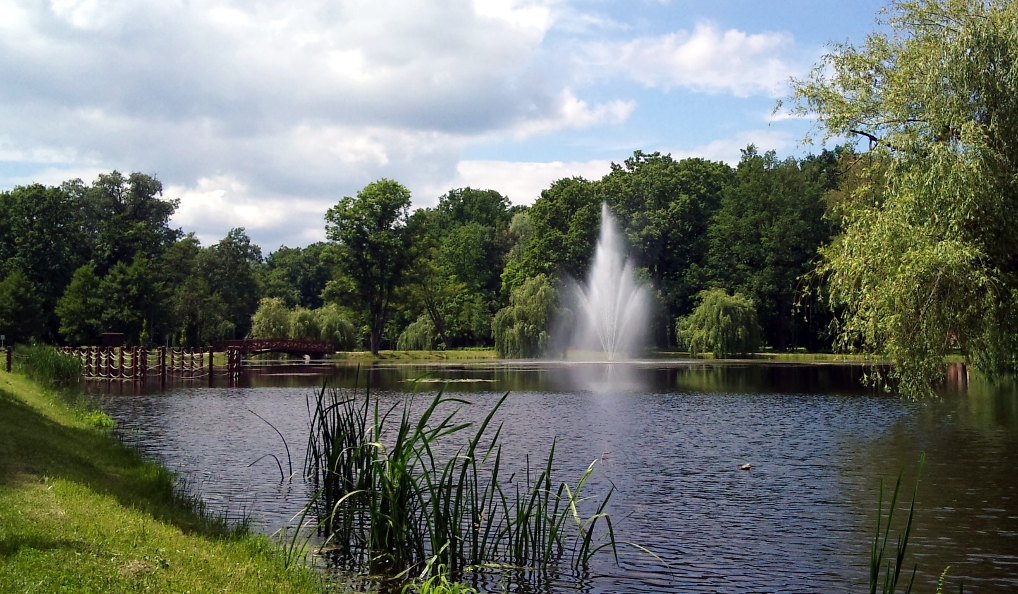
Palace park

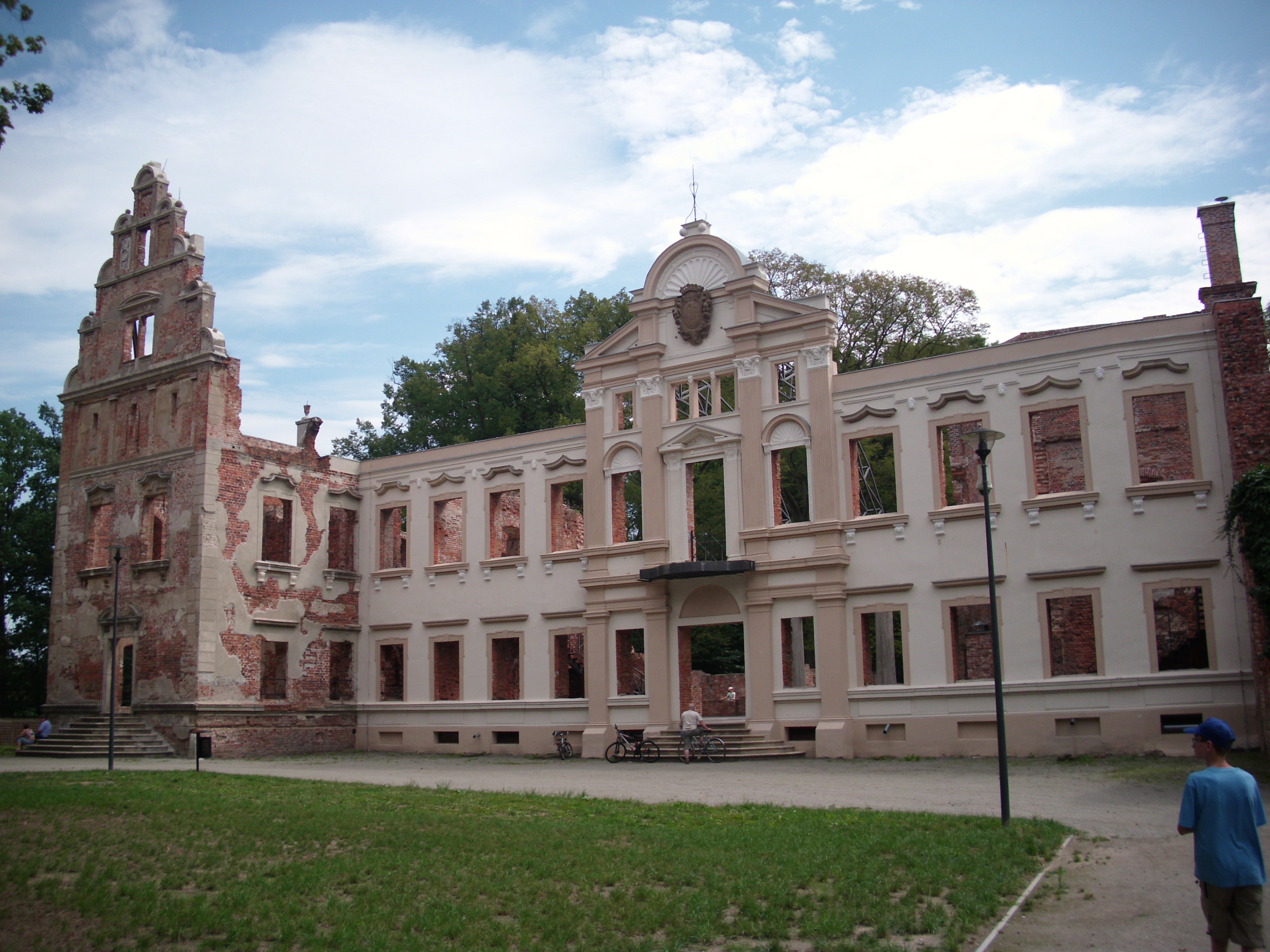
Schaffgotsch Palace ruins in 2010

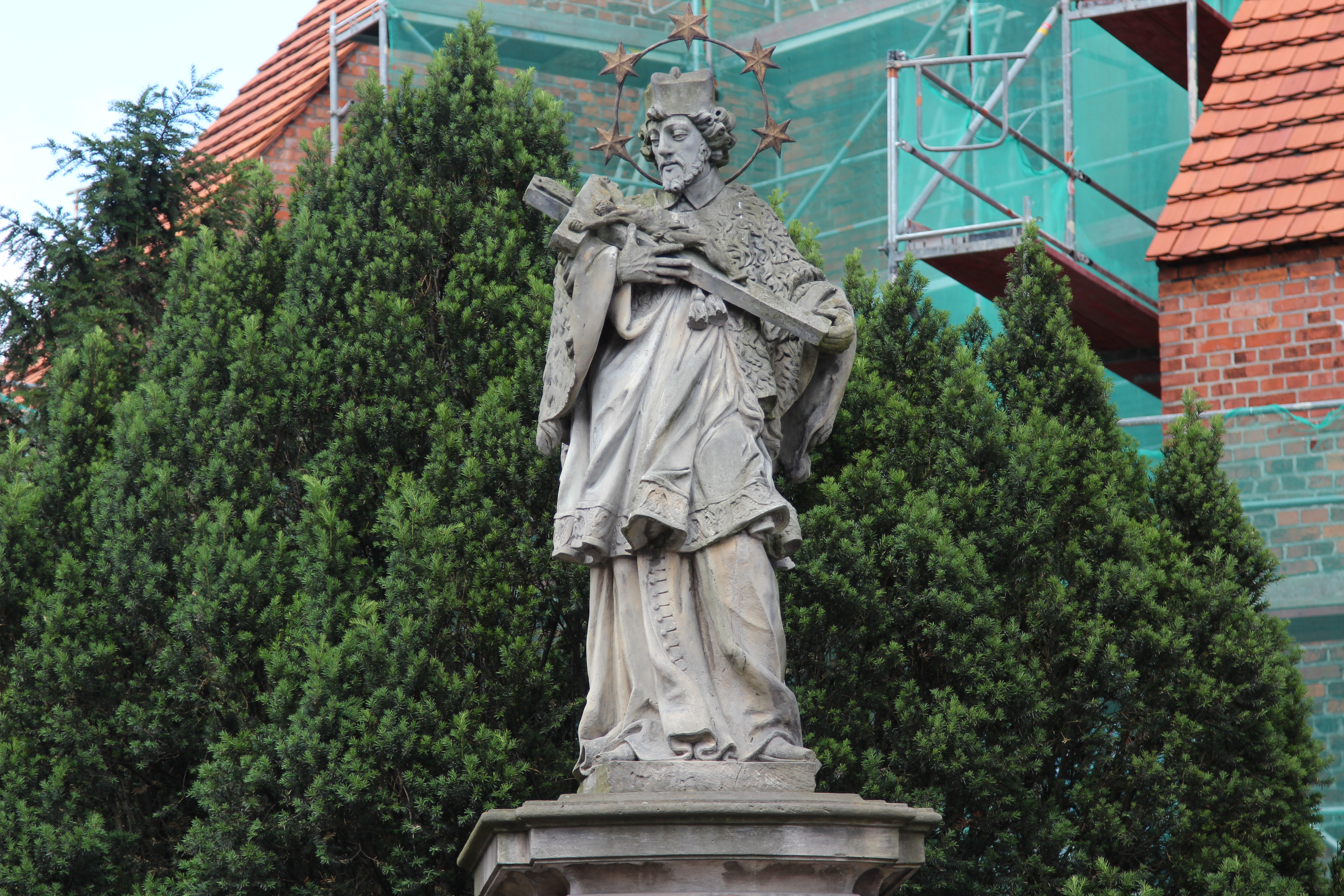
Saint John of Nepomuk statue
