= Dobrosławice =

Dobrosławice may refer to the following places in Poland:

- Dobrosławice, Lower Silesian Voivodeship (south-west Poland)
- Dobrosławice, Opole Voivodeship (south-west Poland)
