= Barkowo =

Barkowo may refer to the following places in Poland:

- Barkowo, Lower Silesian Voivodeship (south-west Poland)
- Barkowo, Pomeranian Voivodeship (north Poland)
- Barkowo, Warmian-Masurian Voivodeship (north Poland)
- Barkowo, West Pomeranian Voivodeship (north-west Poland)
