= Gatka (disambiguation) =

Gatka is a Sikh fencing performance art. Gatka may also refer to:

Places in Poland

- Gatka, Lower Silesian Voivodeship (south-west Poland)
- Gatka, Mława County in Masovian Voivodeship (east-central Poland)
- Gatka, Pułtusk County in Masovian Voivodeship (east-central Poland)
- Gatka, Bytów County in Pomeranian Voivodeship (east Poland)
- Gatka, Słupsk County in Pomeranian Voivodeship (east Poland)

Surname

- Tomasz Gatka (born 1974), Polish Olympic bobsledder

Others

- Chatka gatka The original khalsa Sikh and Indian battlefield martial arts known as Shastar Vidiya.

== See also ==
- Gataka (disambiguation)
