= Grądzik =

Grądzik may refer to the following places in Poland:

- Grądzik, Lower Silesian Voivodeship (south-west Poland)
- Grądzik, Masovian Voivodeship (east-central Poland)
- Grądzik, Warmian-Masurian Voivodeship (north Poland)
