= Siege of Kraków (1657) =

1657 siege

- Part of the Second Northern War and The Deluge
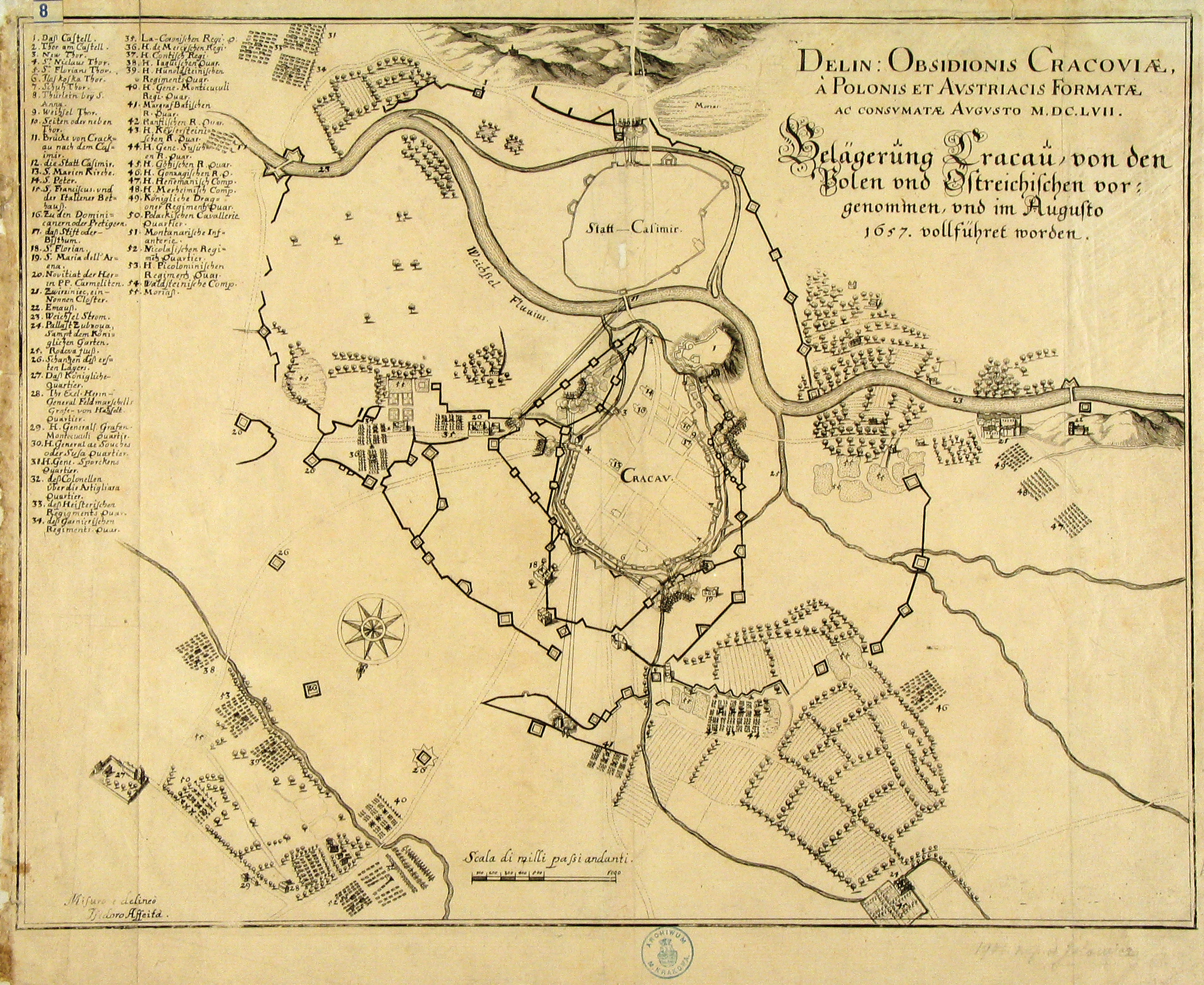
- Siege of Kraków, 1657
Date	July and August 1657
Location	Kraków, Poland
Result	Polish-Austrian victory

Belligerents
Swedish Empire; Transylvania	Polish–Lithuanian Commonwealth; Holy Roman Empire

Commanders and leaders
(Swedish Empire) Paul Wirtz (Transylvania) János Bethlen	Jerzy Lubomirski (Holy Roman Empire) Melchior von Hatzfeldt

Strength
2,500 Swedes and 2,500 Transilvanians	Unknown number of Poles, some 17,000 Austrians

Casualties and losses
Unknown	Unknown

The siege of Kraków was one of the military conflicts of the Swedish and Transylvanian invasion of Poland, which took place in the summer of 1657. The royal city of Kraków, had been occupied for two years by a Swedish-Transylvanian garrison led by Paul Wirtz and János Bethlen. It was besieged by Polish Army of Hetman Jerzy Lubomirski, supported by soldiers of the Holy Roman Empire under Austrian field marshal Melchior von Hatzfeldt.

== Background ==
Two years prior to the 1657 siege, in the summer of 1655, two armies of the Swedish Empire invaded the Polish–Lithuanian Commonwealth, see Deluge (history). The Swedish invaders moved southwards, reaching the city of Kraków in late September 1655. After the Siege of Kraków (1655), the ancient Polish capital surrendered, and on October 17, Swedish soldiers along with King Charles X Gustav entered the city. The looting of Kraków's treasures followed. In some districts not a single house was left standing, as in Garbary and in Biskupie. For the next two years the amount of destruction, pillage and methodical plunder was so enormous that some former parts of the city had never recovered from it.

According to the Treaty of Radnot signed on December 6, 1656, Kraków was to be occupied by Prince of Transylvania, George II Rákóczi, who was an ally of Charles X Gustav. In January 1657, the Transylvanian army invaded southern provinces of the Kingdom of Poland (Red Ruthenia and Lesser Poland), and on March 28, the Transylvanians reached Kraków. Rákóczi left, in the city, some 2,500 soldiers, who strengthened the Swedish garrison already stationed there. Most of the Transylvanian army headed northwards, to meet the Swedes.

== Siege ==
In early summer 1657, Polish Crown units under Hetman Jerzy Lubomirski arrived near Kraków, but lacking artillery, the Poles limited their activities to cutting Swedish and Transylvanian supply routes. In early August, the 17,000 strong army of Holy Roman Empire, under Field Marshal Melchior von Hatzfeldt, reinforced the Poles, and began preparations for an assault. On August 4, however, a message from Rákóczi was received by both sides. Since his army had been destroyed in the Battle of Czarny Ostrow (July 20), Rákóczi urged János Bethlen to surrender the city to the Poles.

The Transylvanians capitulated, but Swedish garrison of Kraków, under Paul Wirtz, continued resistance until August 25. Five days later, Swedish units left the city, and on September 4, Poles, together with Austrians, organized a military parade, observed by King Jan Kazimierz.

== Aftermath ==
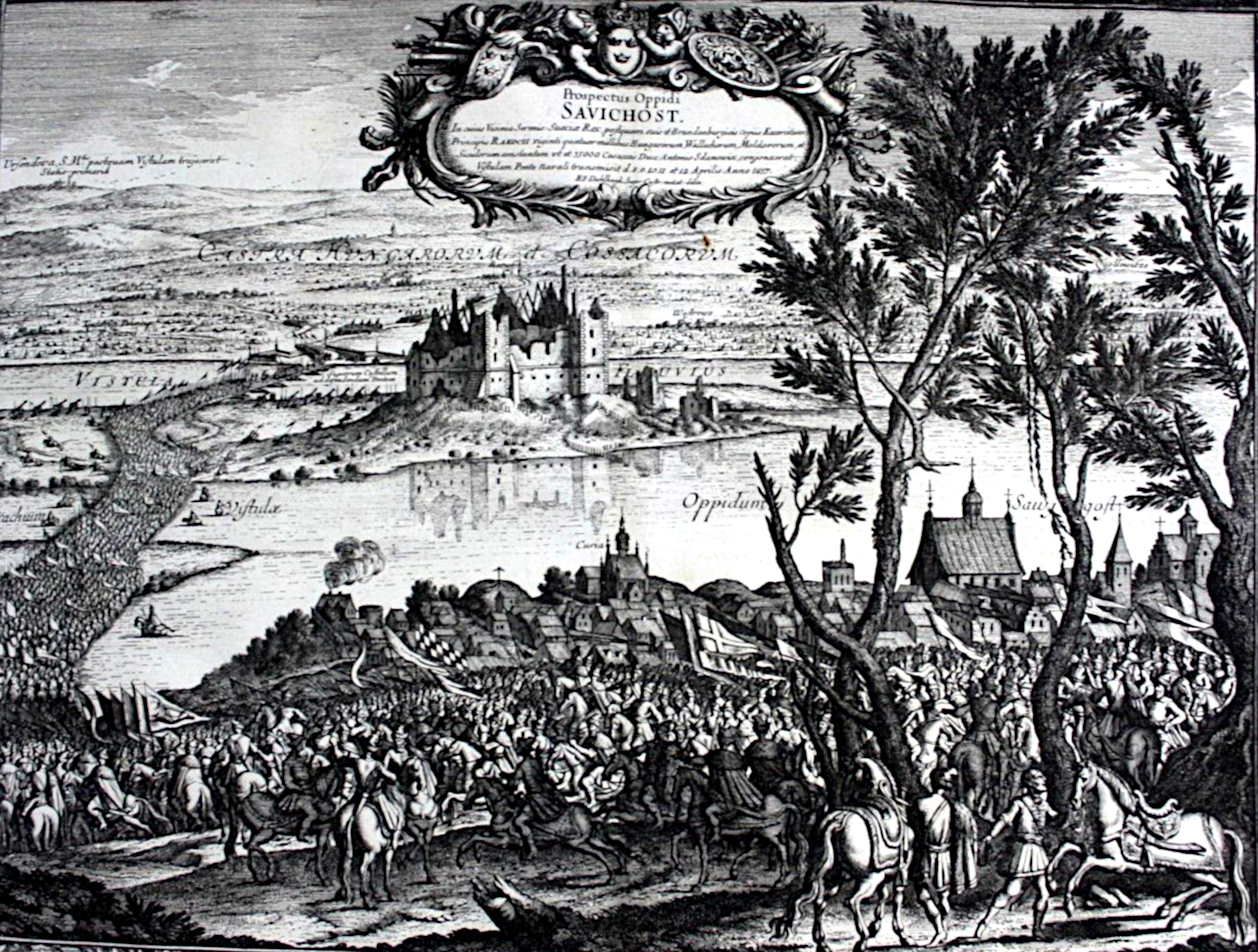
Rákóczi exiting through destroyed Zawichost. The sheer size of his army required that in order to requisite adequate food, it migrated between regions constantly like a cloud of locusts

After a two-year Swedish and Transilvanian occupation, the ancient capital of Poland was in ruins. All villages and towns in the area were burned to the ground, as well as the suburbs of Kraków. In Kleparz, only 15 people dwelled in huts, while at Bishop Square, only 5 houses remained, out of 51. In the district of Piaski, which had several hundred houses before the Swedish invasion, not a single building remained. The Wawel Hill was completely looted, as Swedes and Transylvanians had stolen almost everything of value: including the Polish treasury, books, carpets and even upholstery. Furthermore, Swedes destroyed the tomb of St. Stanislaus.

== Sources ==
- Jaroslaw Stolicki, Oblezenie Krakowa przez Jerzego Lubomirskiego w latach 1656-1657. SiM do historii wojskowosci, vol. XL, Bialystok 2003, pp. 87–117
- Leszek Podhorodecki, Rapier i koncerz, Warsaw 1985, ISBN 83-05-11452-X, pp. 345–346
