= Bychowo =

Bychowo may refer to the following places in Poland:

- Bychowo, Lower Silesian Voivodeship (south-west Poland)
- Bychowo, Pomeranian Voivodeship (north Poland)
