= Karnice, Trzebnica County =

Karnice
- Village
- Location within Poland
- Coordinates: 51°28′57″N 16°50′27″E
- Country: Poland
- Voivodeship: Lower Silesian
- County: Trzebnica
- Gmina: Żmigród
- Population: 170

Karnice [karˈnit͡sɛ] is a village in the administrative district of Gmina Żmigród, within Trzebnica County, Lower Silesian Voivodeship, in south-western Poland.
