= Korzeńsko =

- Village
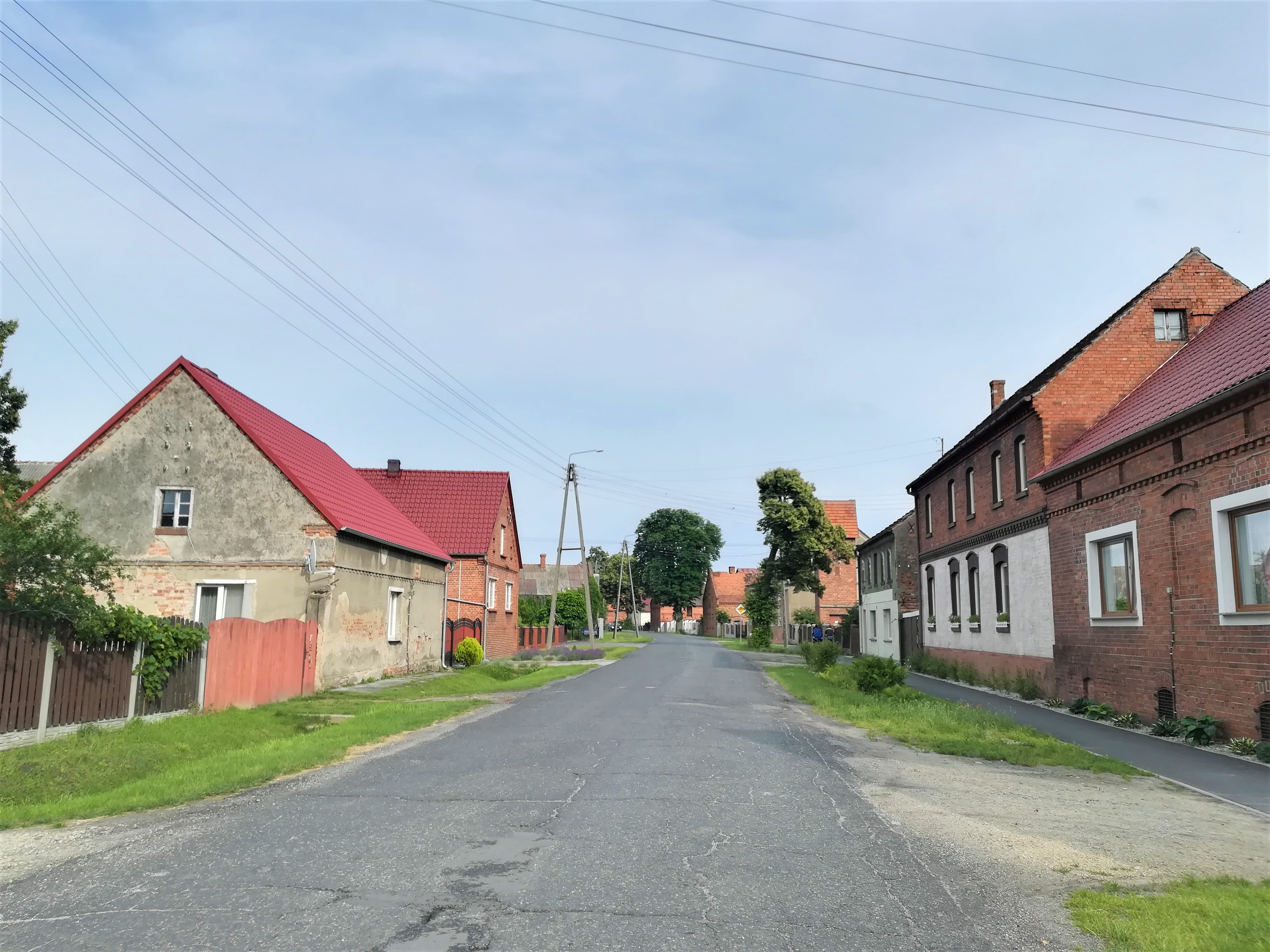

- Location within Poland
- Coordinates: 51°32′N 16°53′E
- Country: Poland
- Voivodeship: Lower Silesian
- County: Trzebnica
- Gmina: Żmigród
- Population (approx.): 1,000

Korzeńsko [kɔˈʐɛɲskɔ] is a village in the administrative district of Gmina Żmigród, within Trzebnica County, Lower Silesian Voivodeship, in south-western Poland. Korzeńsko is the most populous village in Gmina Żmigród.
