= Książęca Wieś =

- Village
- Location within Poland
- Coordinates: 51°27′41″N 17°02′26″E
- Country: Poland
- Voivodeship: Lower Silesian
- County: Trzebnica
- Gmina: Żmigród

Książęca Wieś [kɕɔ̃ˈʐɛnt͡sa ˈvjɛɕ] is a village in the administrative district of Gmina Żmigród, within Trzebnica County, Lower Silesian Voivodeship, in south-western Poland.
