= Ruda Żmigrodzka =

- Village
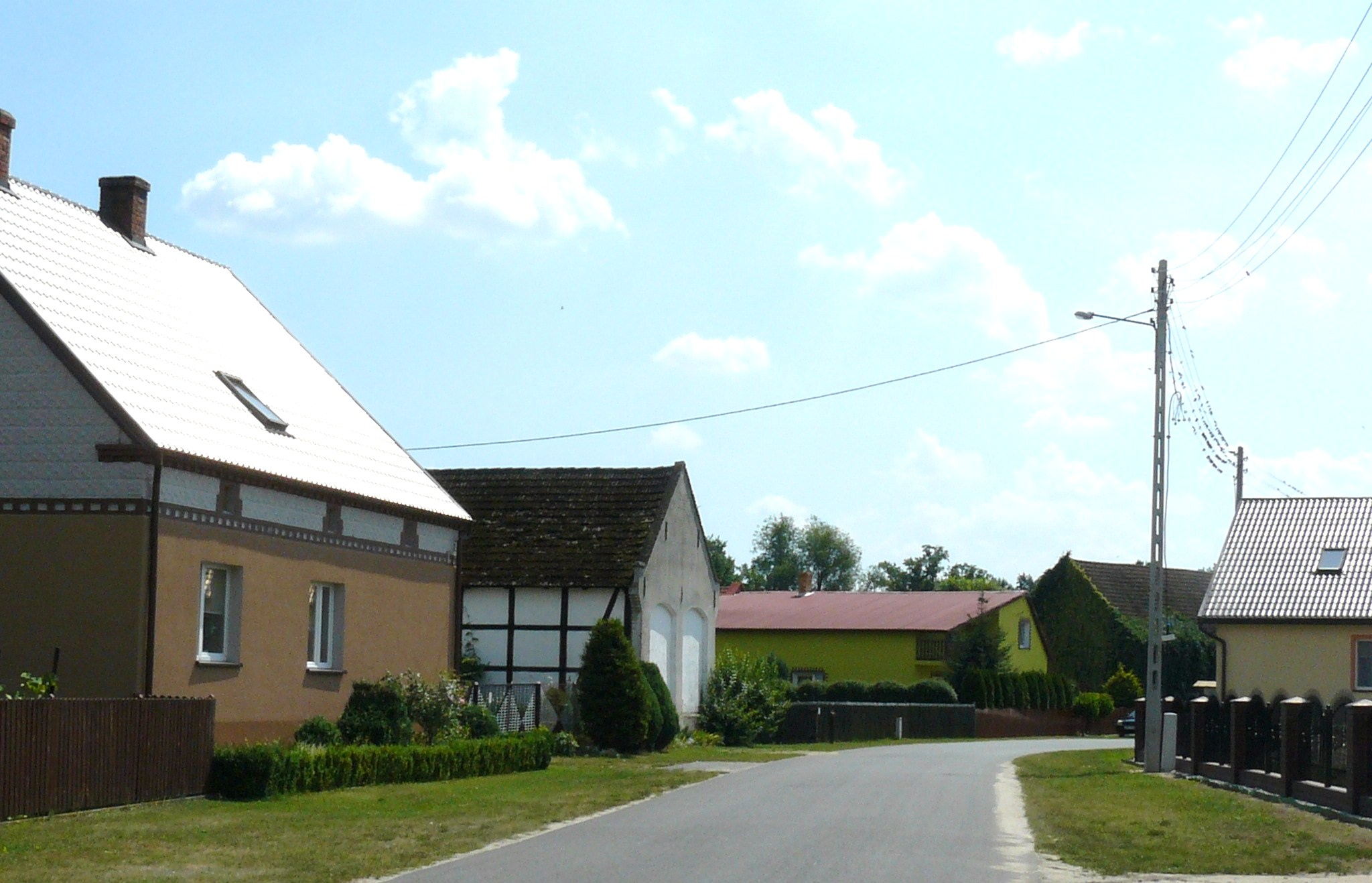
- House complex in Ruda Zmigrodzka

- Location within Poland
- Coordinates: 51°29′29″N 17°01′31″E
- Country: Poland
- Voivodeship: Lower Silesian
- County: Trzebnica
- Gmina: Żmigród

Ruda Żmigrodzka [ˈruda ʐmiˈɡrɔt͡ska] is a village in the administrative district of Gmina Żmigród, within Trzebnica County, Lower Silesian Voivodeship, in south-western Poland.
