= Węglewo, Trzebnica County =

Węglewo
- Village
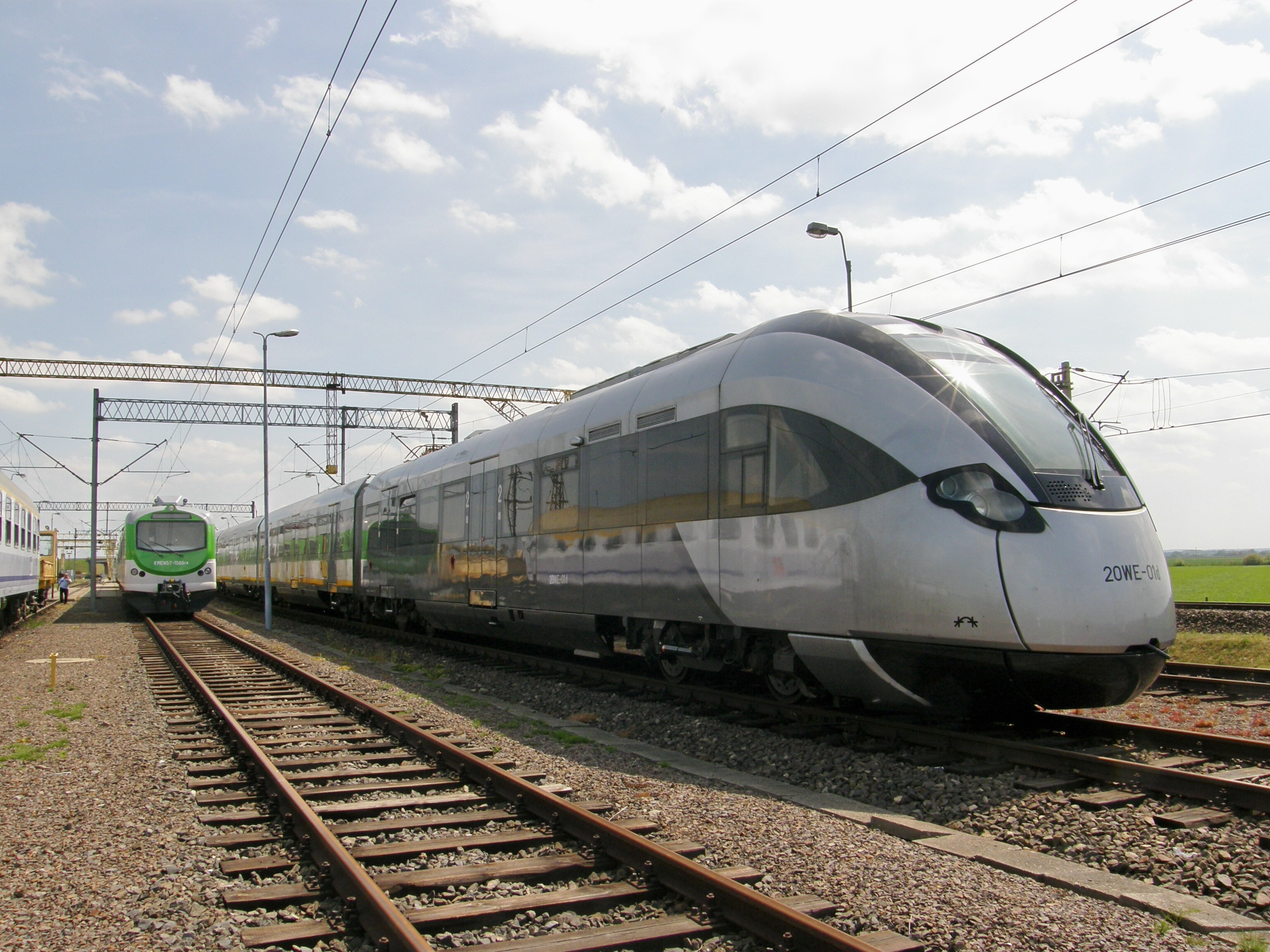
- Newag 20 WE in Węglewo

- Location within Poland
- Coordinates: 51°27′55″N 16°52′20″E
- Country: Poland
- Voivodeship: Lower Silesian
- County: Trzebnica
- Gmina: Żmigród

Węglewo [vɛŋˈɡlɛvɔ] is a village in the administrative district of Gmina Żmigród, within Trzebnica County, Lower Silesian Voivodeship, in south-western Poland.
