= Przedkowice =

- Village
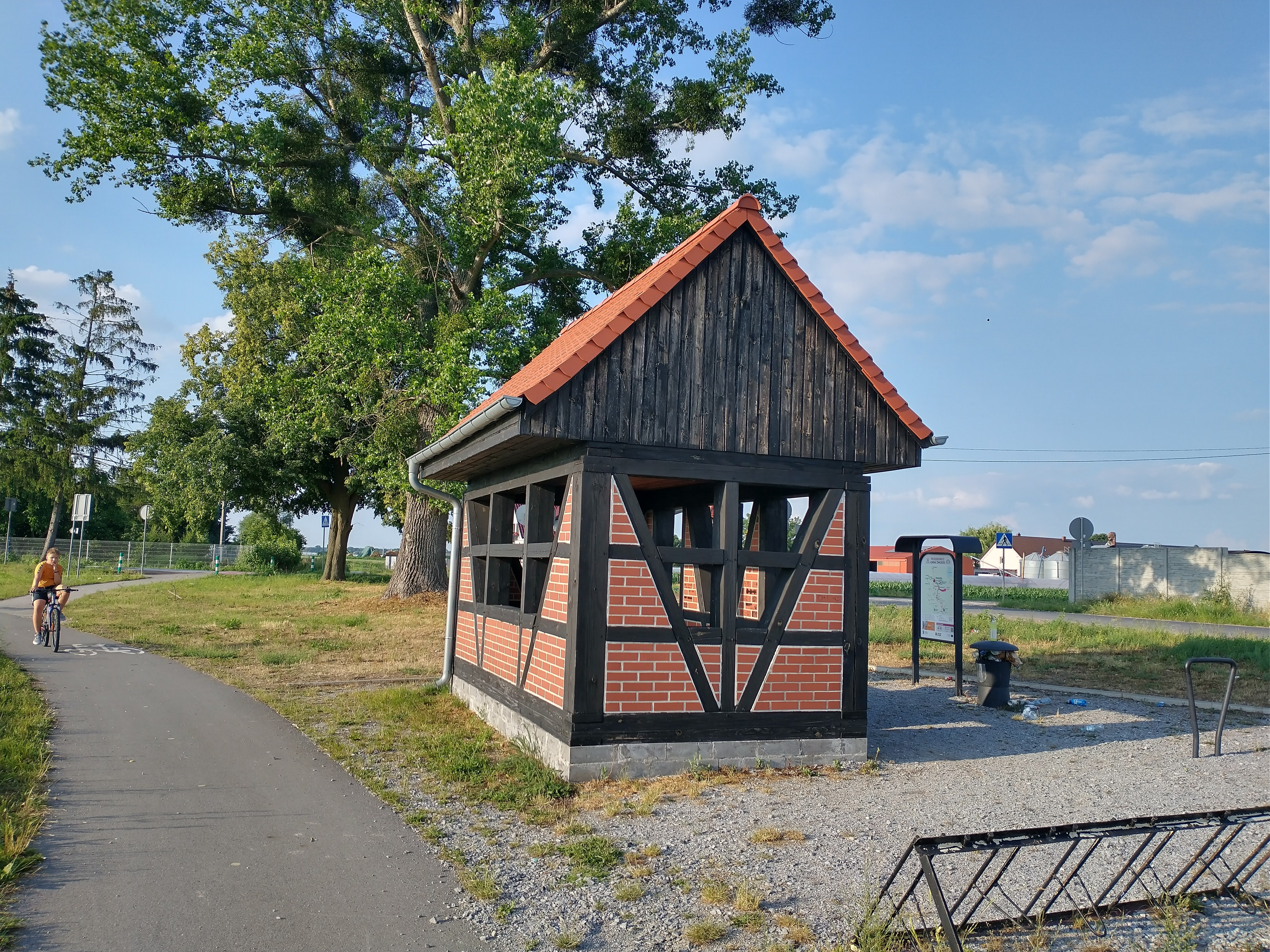
- Old railway station

- Location within Poland
- Coordinates: 51°26′N 16°59′E
- Country: Poland
- Voivodeship: Lower Silesian
- County: Trzebnica
- Gmina: Żmigród

Przedkowice [pʂɛtkɔˈvit͡sɛ] is a village in the administrative district of Gmina Żmigród, within Trzebnica County, Lower Silesian Voivodeship, in south-western Poland.
