= Borek, Trzebnica County =

Borek
- Village
- Location within Poland
- Coordinates: 51°30′33″N 16°54′23″E
- Country: Poland
- Voivodeship: Lower Silesian
- County: Trzebnica
- Gmina: Żmigród

Borek [ˈbɔrɛk] is a village in the administrative district of Gmina Żmigród, within Trzebnica County, Lower Silesian Voivodeship, in south-western Poland.
