= Dębno, Trzebnica County =

Dębno
- Village
- Location within Poland
- Coordinates: 51°33′33″N 16°53′33″E
- Country: Poland
- Voivodeship: Lower Silesian
- County: Trzebnica
- Gmina: Żmigród

Dębno [ˈdɛmbnɔ] is a village in the administrative district of Gmina Żmigród, within Trzebnica County, Lower Silesian Voivodeship, in south-western Poland.
