= Melchior von Hatzfeldt =

German professional soldier in the Imperial army

Graf Melchior Graf von Gleichen und Hatzfeldt
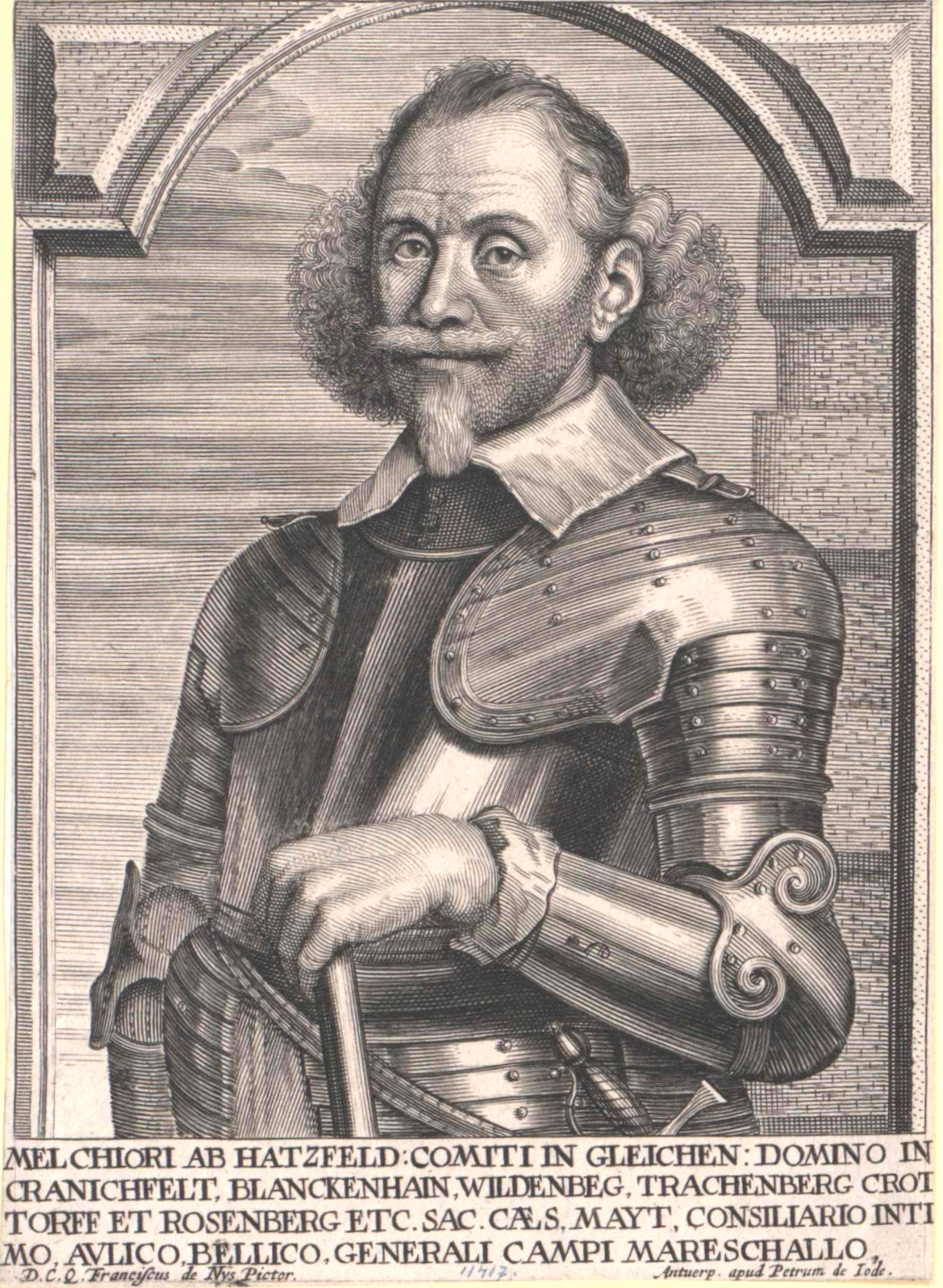
- Melchior von Hatzfeldt
- Born: 20 October 1593; Westerwald, Holy Roman Empire
- Died: 9 January 1658 (aged 64) Powitzko, Habsburg Silesia (now Powidzko, Poland)
- Buried: Prausnitz, Habsburg Silesia
- Allegiance: Holy Roman Empire
- Rank: Generalfeldmarschall
- Conflicts: Thirty Years War: Battle of Stadtlohn (1623); Battle of Breitenfeld (1631); Siege of Kaiserslautern (1635); Siege of Magdeburg (1636); Battle of Wittstock (1636); Battle of Vlotho (1638); Siege of Dorsten (1641); Battle of Tuttlingen (1643); Battle of Jankau (1645) (surrendered); Second Northern War: Siege of Kraków (1657)

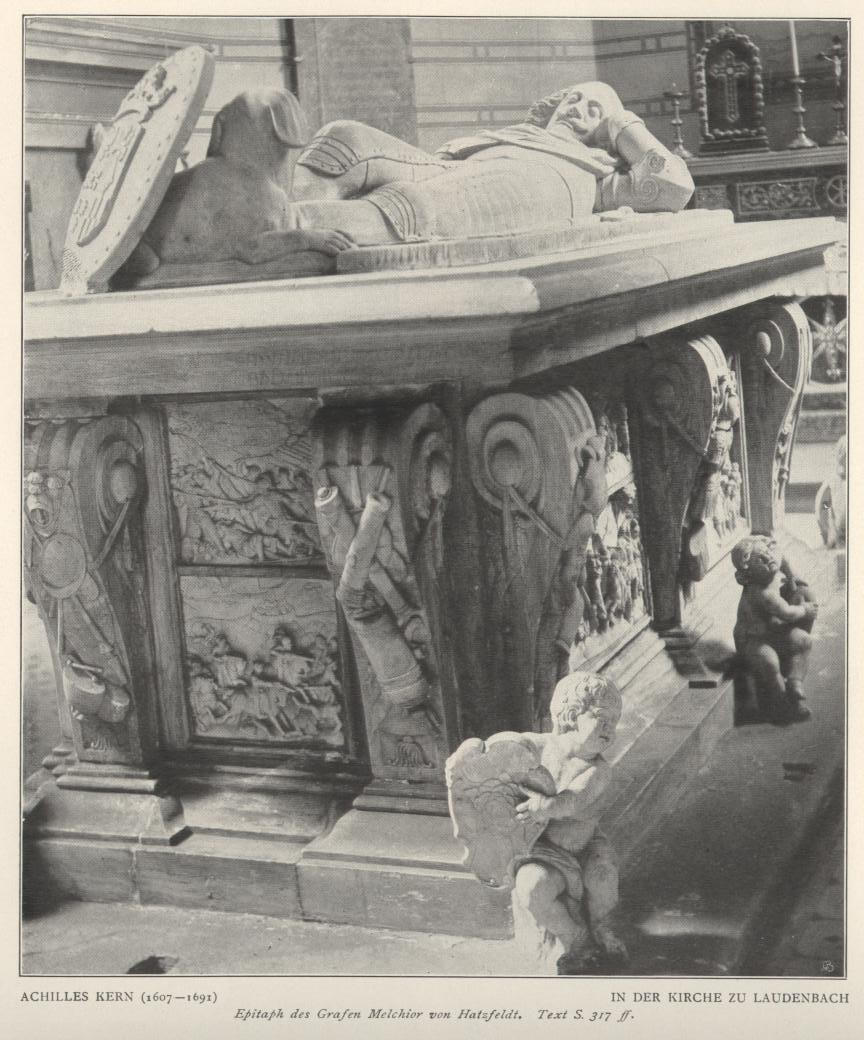
His tomb in the Bergkirche Laudenbach (Weikersheim)

Melchior Graf von Gleichen und Hatzfeldt (Westerwald, 20 October 1593 – Powitzko, 9 January 1658) was an Imperial Field Marshal. He fought in the Thirty Years' War first under Albrecht von Wallenstein and Matthias Gallas, then received an independent command in Westphalia. Usually successful with a smaller corps on this secondary front and victorious at Vlotho and Dorsten, he lost at Wittstock and Jankau in his brief intermezzos as commander of major armies.

== Biography ==
He was the second of five sons of Sebastian von Hatzfeldt and Lucie von Sickingen. His younger brother was Franz von Hatzfeldt, Prince-Bishop of Würzburg. Designated for an ecclesiastical career, Melchior visited the Jesuit seminary in Fulda and studied at different universities in Germany and France. However at the outbreak of the Thirty Years' War he became a soldier and entered the Imperial Army. First serving under the Protestant commanders Julius Henry of Saxe-Lauenburg and Adolf of Holstein-Gottorf, he participated at the victory of Stadtlohn in 1623. Entering Wallenstein's army in 1625, he became Lieutenant Colonel in the regiment of Franz Albrecht of Saxe-Lauenburg and subsequently fought in Lower Saxony, Hungary, Denmark and Mantua. After the Battle of Breitenfeld in 1631, he rapidly advanced through the ranks; he obtained his own regiment and became Colonel in 1632, then was promoted to Feldmarschalleutnant in 1633.

After the murder of Wallenstein in February 1634, he entered the service of Matthias Gallas. For his contribution to the capture of Kaiserslautern in 1635, he was promoted to Field Marshal. Following the Peace of Prague in the same year, he supported the Saxon Elector John George I with an Imperial corps against the Swedes. After he captured Magdeburg from them, he suffered a defeat in the Battle of Wittstock against the Swedish forces under Johan Banér and Alexander Leslie on 4 October 1636.

More successful on the Westphalian theatre of the war, he was victorious in the Battle of Vlotho in 1638 and again at the Siege of Dorsten in 1641. In 1643, he aided the Bavarians under Franz von Mercy in their successful attack on the French army in their winter quarters at Tuttlingen. On 6 March 1645 Hatzfeldt was taken prisoner by the Swedes during the Battle of Jankau, but released shortly after. He retired in 1646, but was recalled to service in 1657 as Generalfeldmarschall, to support the King of Poland at the head of an army of 16,000 men against Charles X Gustav of Sweden. He took Kraków on August 30 but soon was forced to retire because of his health.

He died a few months after his return home. His body was buried in Prausnitz, and his heart at Laudenbach (Weikersheim). Both tombs were constructed by Achilles Kern (1607–1691).

== In fiction ==
He is a major character in 1635: The Wars for the Rhine by Anette Pedersen, part of Eric Flint's 1632 series.
