= Garbce =

- Village
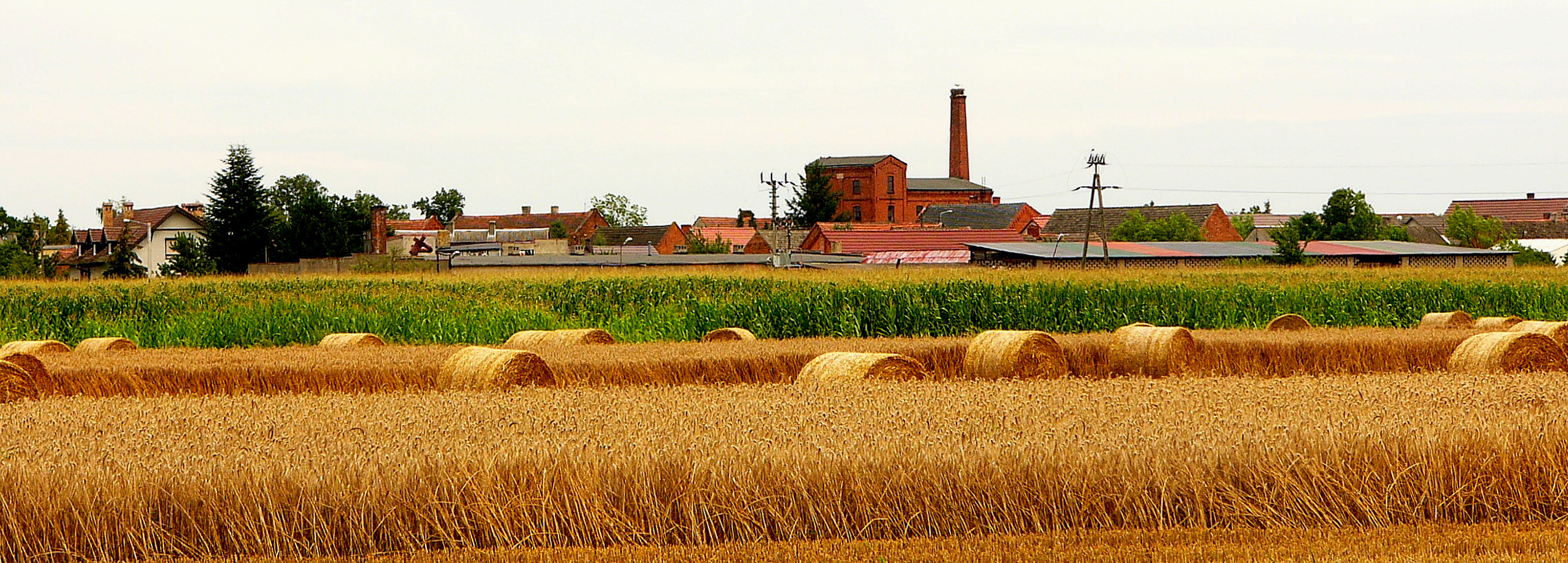
- Blick auf (Garbce)

- Location within Poland
- Coordinates: 51°30′48″N 16°53′01″E
- Country: Poland
- Voivodeship: Lower Silesian
- County: Trzebnica
- Gmina: Żmigród

Garbce [ˈɡarpt͡sɛ] is a village in the administrative district of Gmina Żmigród, in Trzebnica County, Lower Silesian Voivodeship, in south-western Poland.
