= Gmina Żmigród =

Gmina Żmigród Żmigród Commune
- Gmina
- Flag Coat of arms
- Interactive map of Gmina Żmigród
- Coordinates (Żmigród): 51°28′13″N 16°54′18″E
- Country: Poland
- Voivodeship: Lower Silesian
- County: Trzebnica
- Seat: Żmigród
- Sołectwos: Barkowo, Borek, Borzęcin, Bychowo, Chodlewo, Dębno, Dobrosławice, Garbce, Gatka, Grądzik, Kanclerzowice, Karnice, Kaszyce Milickie, Kędzie, Kliszkowice, Korzeńsko, Książęca Wieś, Łapczyce, Laskowa, Morzęcino, Niezgoda, Osiek, Powidzko, Przedkowice, Przywsie, Radziądz, Ruda Żmigrodzka, Sanie, Węglewo, Żmigródek

Area
  - Total: 292.14 km^{2} (112.80 sq mi)

Population
  - Total: 14,666
  - Density: 50.202/km^{2} (130.02/sq mi)
  - Urban: 6,435
  - Rural: 8,231
- Website: http://www.zmigrod.com.pl

Gmina Żmigród is an urban-rural gmina (administrative district) in Trzebnica County, Lower Silesian Voivodeship, in south-western Poland. Its seat is the town of Żmigród, which lies approximately 22 kilometres (14 mi) north-west of Trzebnica, and 40 kilometres (25 mi) north of the regional capital Wrocław. It is part of the Wrocław metropolitan area.

The gmina covers an area of 292.14 square kilometres (112.8 sq mi). As of 2019, its total population was 14,666.

The Test Track Centre near Żmigród is situated here.

== Neighbouring gminas ==
Gmina Żmigród is bordered by the gminas of Milicz, Prusice, Rawicz, Trzebnica, Wąsosz and Wińsko.

== Villages ==
Apart from the town of Żmigród, the gmina contains the villages of Barkowo, Borek, Borzęcin, Bychowo, Chodlewo, Dębno, Dobrosławice, Garbce, Gatka, Grądzik, Kanclerzowice, Karnice, Kaszyce Milickie, Kędzie, Kliszkowice, Korzeńsko, Książęca Wieś, Łapczyce, Laskowa, Morzęcino, Niezgoda, Osiek, Powidzko, Przedkowice, Przywsie, Radziądz, Ruda Żmigrodzka, Sanie, Węglewo and Żmigródek.

== Twin towns – sister cities ==
Gmina Żmigród is twinned with:

- Bargteheide, Germany
