= Niezgoda, Lower Silesian Voivodeship =

Niezgoda
- Village
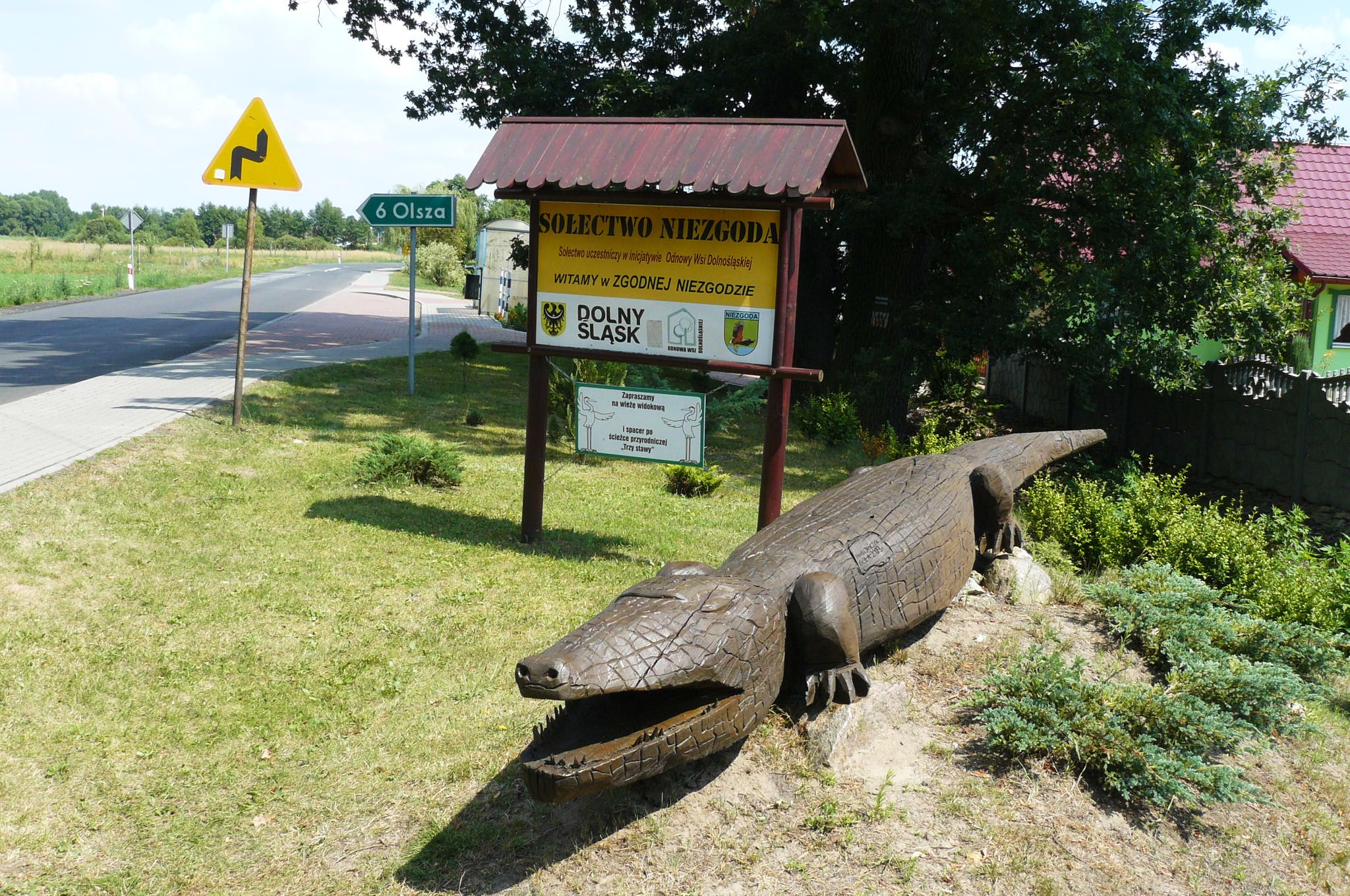

- Location within Poland
- Coordinates: 51°31′N 17°3′E
- Country: Poland
- Voivodeship: Lower Silesian
- County: Trzebnica
- Gmina: Żmigród

Niezgoda [ɲɛzˈɡɔda] is a village in the administrative district of Gmina Żmigród, within Trzebnica County, Lower Silesian Voivodeship, in south-western Poland.
