= Gataka =

Gataka may refer to:

- A spelling variation for Gatka, the martial art of the Sikhs.
- Gataka, the scene name of the Israeli DJ Matan Kadosh, also famous for participating in psytrance trio Sesto Sento.

== See also ==
- Gattaca
- Gatka (disambiguation)
