= Przywsie =

- Village
- Location within Poland
- Coordinates: 51°34′34″N 16°52′35″E
- Country: Poland
- Voivodeship: Lower Silesian
- County: Trzebnica
- Gmina: Żmigród

Przywsie [ˈpʂɨfɕɛ] is a village in the administrative district of Gmina Żmigród, within Trzebnica County, Lower Silesian Voivodeship, in south-western Poland.
