= Radziądz =

- Village
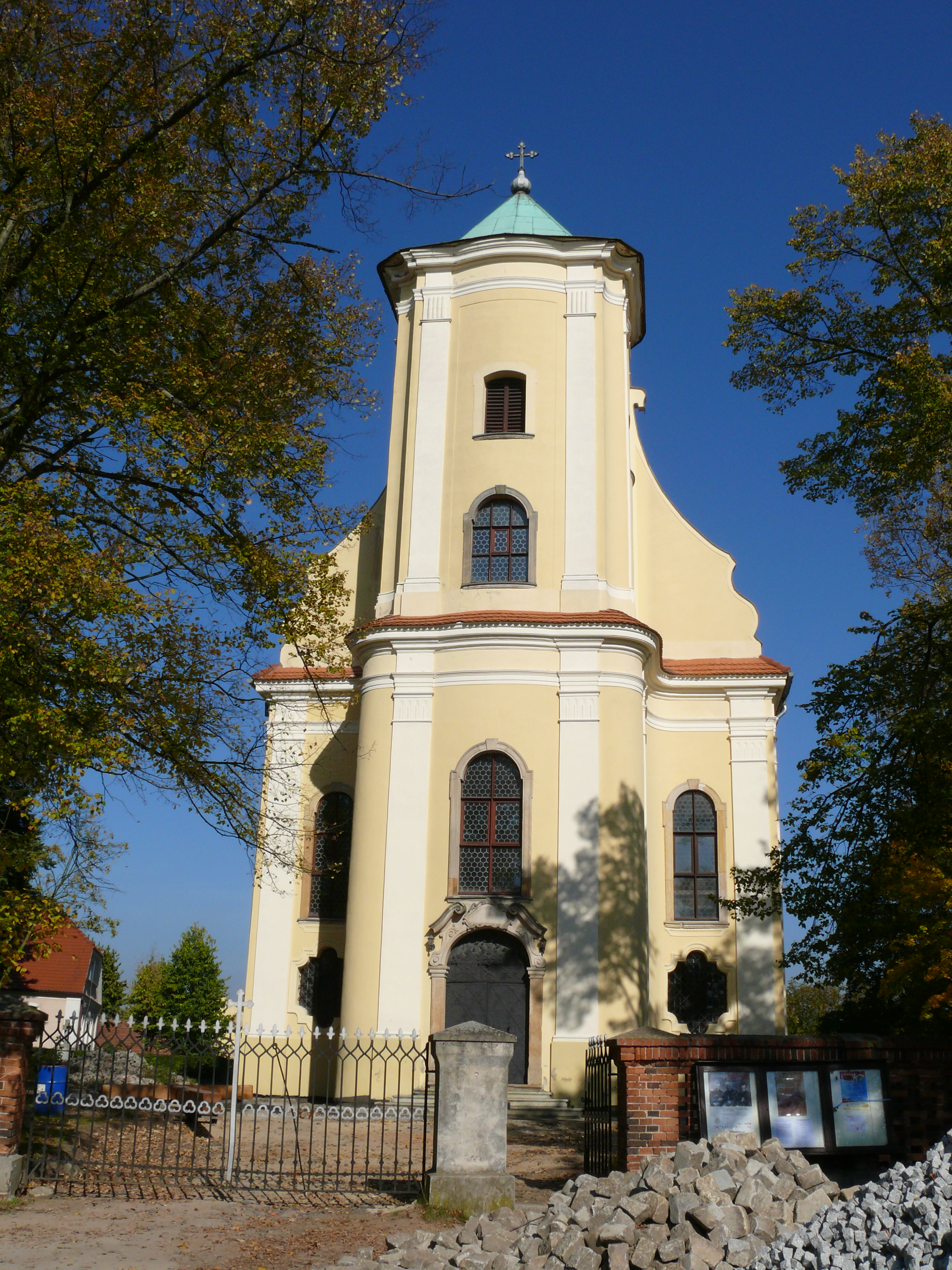
- Church of Saint Charles Borromeo

- Location within Poland
- Coordinates: 51°31′N 16°58′E
- Country: Poland
- Voivodeship: Lower Silesian
- County: Trzebnica
- Gmina: Żmigród

Radziądz [ˈrad͡ʑɔnt͡s] is a village in the administrative district of Gmina Żmigród, within Trzebnica County, Lower Silesian Voivodeship, in south-western Poland.
