= Kaszyce Milickie =

- Village
- Location within Poland
- Coordinates: 51°25′55″N 17°00′08″E
- Country: Poland
- Voivodeship: Lower Silesian
- County: Trzebnica
- Gmina: Żmigród

Kaszyce Milickie [kaˈʂɨt͡sɛ miˈlit͡skʲɛ] is a village in the administrative district of Gmina Żmigród, within Trzebnica County, Lower Silesian Voivodeship, in south-western Poland.
