= Borzęcin, Lower Silesian Voivodeship =

Borzęcin
- Village
- Location within Poland
- Coordinates: 51°26′43″N 16°54′41″E
- Country: Poland
- Voivodeship: Lower Silesian
- County: Trzebnica
- Gmina: Żmigród

Borzęcin [bɔˈʐɛnt͡ɕin] is a village in the administrative district of Gmina Żmigród, within Trzebnica County, Lower Silesian Voivodeship, in south-western Poland.
