= Chodlewo =

- Village
- Location within Poland
- Coordinates: 51°31′50″N 16°50′50″E
- Country: Poland
- Voivodeship: Lower Silesian
- County: Trzebnica
- Gmina: Żmigród

Chodlewo [xɔdˈlɛvɔ] is a village in the administrative district of Gmina Żmigród, within Trzebnica County, Lower Silesian Voivodeship, in south-western Poland.
