= Osiek, Trzebnica County =

Osiek
- Village
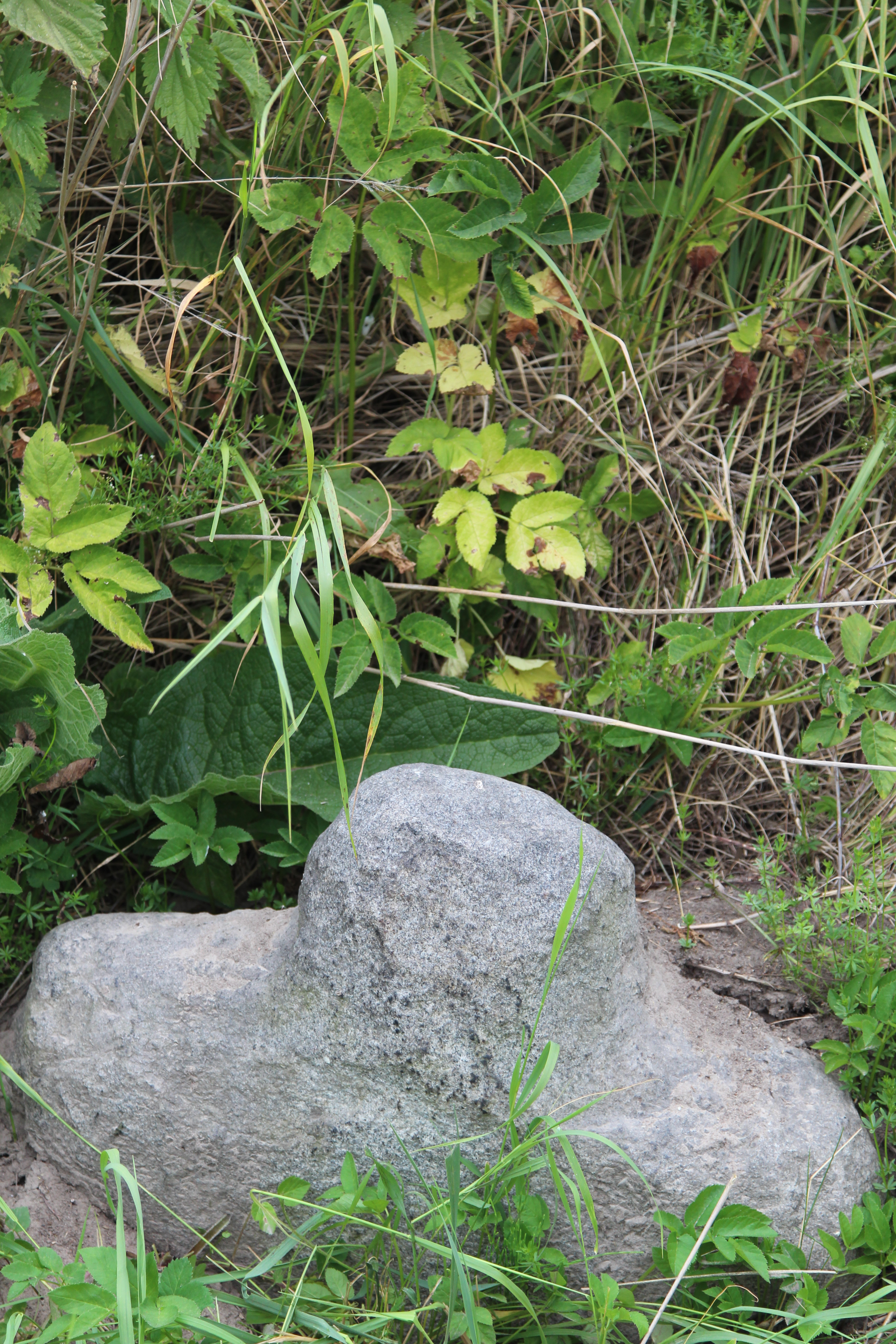
- Osiek stone cross 2014

- Location within Poland
- Coordinates: 51°28′N 17°0′E
- Country: Poland
- Voivodeship: Lower Silesian
- County: Trzebnica
- Gmina: Żmigród

Osiek [ˈɔɕɛk] is a village in the administrative district of Gmina Żmigród, within Trzebnica County, Lower Silesian Voivodeship, in south-western Poland.
