= Gatka, Lower Silesian Voivodeship =

Gatka
- Village
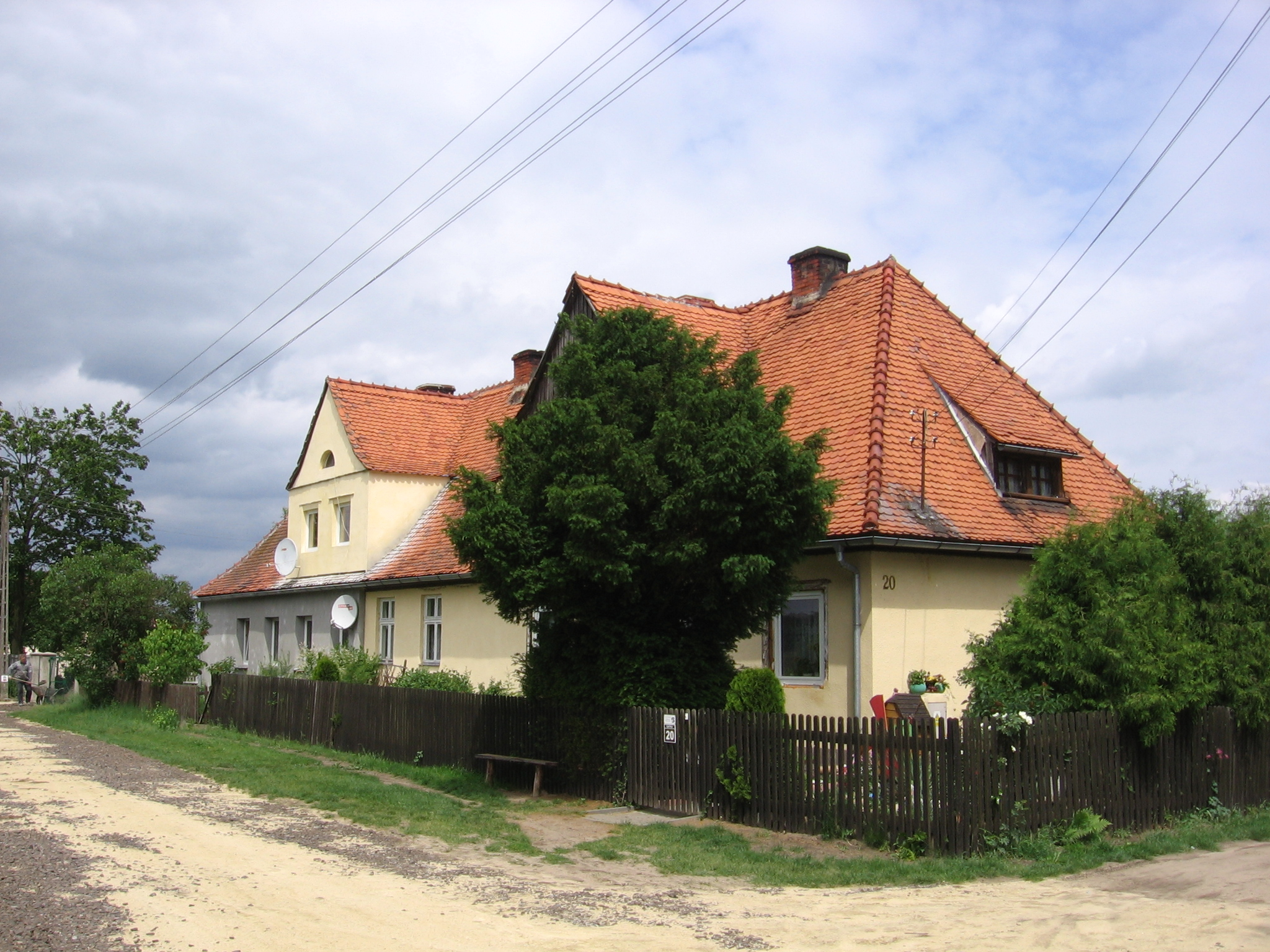
- Former (1920-1939) German Border Guard (Grenzschutz) building near former German-Polish border in Gatka

- Location within Poland
- Coordinates: 51°32′07″N 16°58′36″E
- Country: Poland
- Voivodeship: Lower Silesian
- County: Trzebnica
- Gmina: Żmigród

Gatka (Polish pronunciation: [ˈɡatka]) is a village in the administrative district of Gmina Żmigród, within Trzebnica County, Lower Silesian Voivodeship, in south-western Poland.
