= Laskowa, Lower Silesian Voivodeship =

Laskowa
- Village
- Location within Poland
- Coordinates: 51°34′N 16°50′E
- Country: Poland
- Voivodeship: Lower Silesian
- County: Trzebnica
- Gmina: Żmigród

Laskowa [lasˈkɔva] is a village in the administrative district of Gmina Żmigród, within Trzebnica County, Lower Silesian Voivodeship, in south-western Poland.
