= Grądzik, Lower Silesian Voivodeship =

Grądzik
- Village
- Location within Poland
- Coordinates: 51°27′36″N 16°55′42″E
- Country: Poland
- Voivodeship: Lower Silesian
- County: Trzebnica
- Gmina: Żmigród

Grądzik [ˈɡrɔnd͡ʑik] is a village in the administrative district of Gmina Żmigród, within Trzebnica County, Lower Silesian Voivodeship, in south-western Poland.
