= Dobrosławice, Lower Silesian Voivodeship =

Dobrosławice
- Village
- Location within Poland
- Coordinates: 51°25′33″N 16°58′47″E
- Country: Poland
- Voivodeship: Lower Silesian
- County: Trzebnica
- Gmina: Żmigród

Dobrosławice [dɔbrɔswaˈvit͡sɛ] is a village in the administrative district of Gmina Żmigród, within Trzebnica County, Lower Silesian Voivodeship, in south-western Poland.
