= Powidzko =

- Village
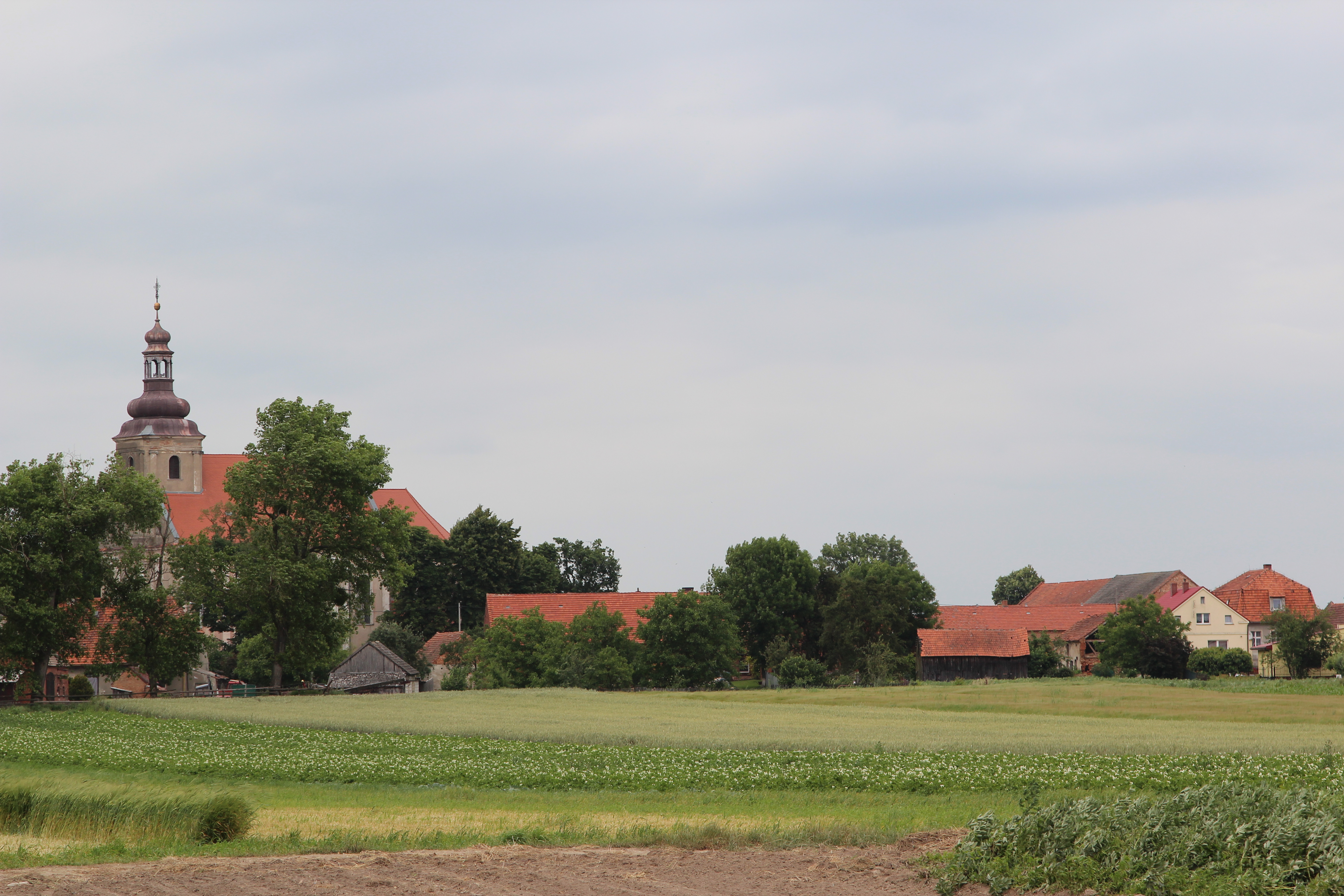

- Location within Poland
- Coordinates: 51°27′N 16°58′E
- Country: Poland
- Voivodeship: Lower Silesian
- County: Trzebnica
- Gmina: Żmigród

Powidzko [pɔˈvit͡skɔ] is a village in the administrative district of Gmina Żmigród, within Trzebnica County, Lower Silesian Voivodeship, in south-western Poland.
