= Żmigródek =

- Village
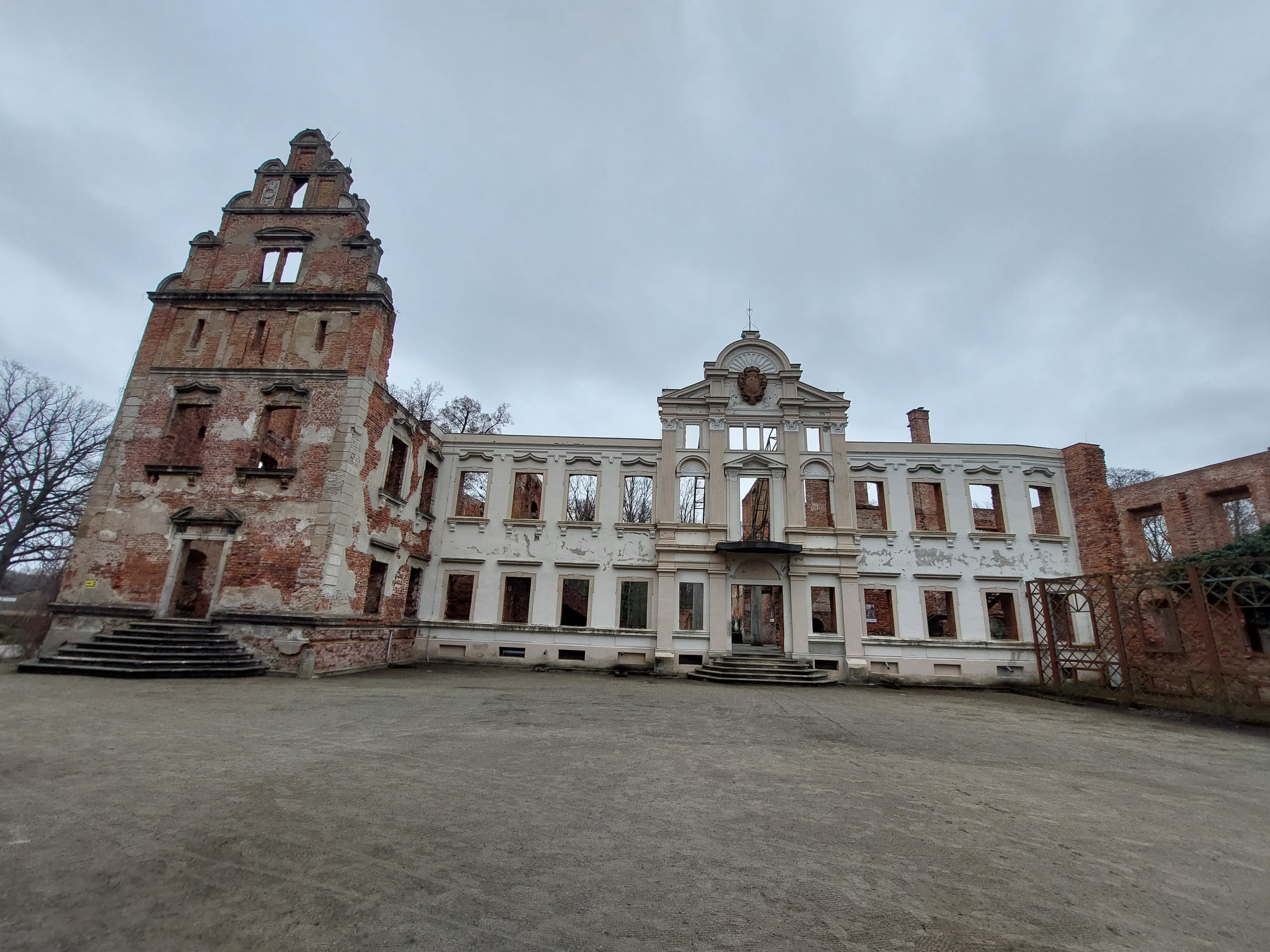
- Palace

- Location within Poland
- Coordinates: 51°29′16″N 16°55′02″E
- Country: Poland
- Voivodeship: Lower Silesian
- County: Trzebnica
- Gmina: Żmigród

Żmigródek [ʐmiˈɡrudɛk] is a village in the administrative district of Gmina Żmigród, within Trzebnica County, Lower Silesian Voivodeship, in south-western Poland.
