= Bychowo, Lower Silesian Voivodeship =

Bychowo
- Village
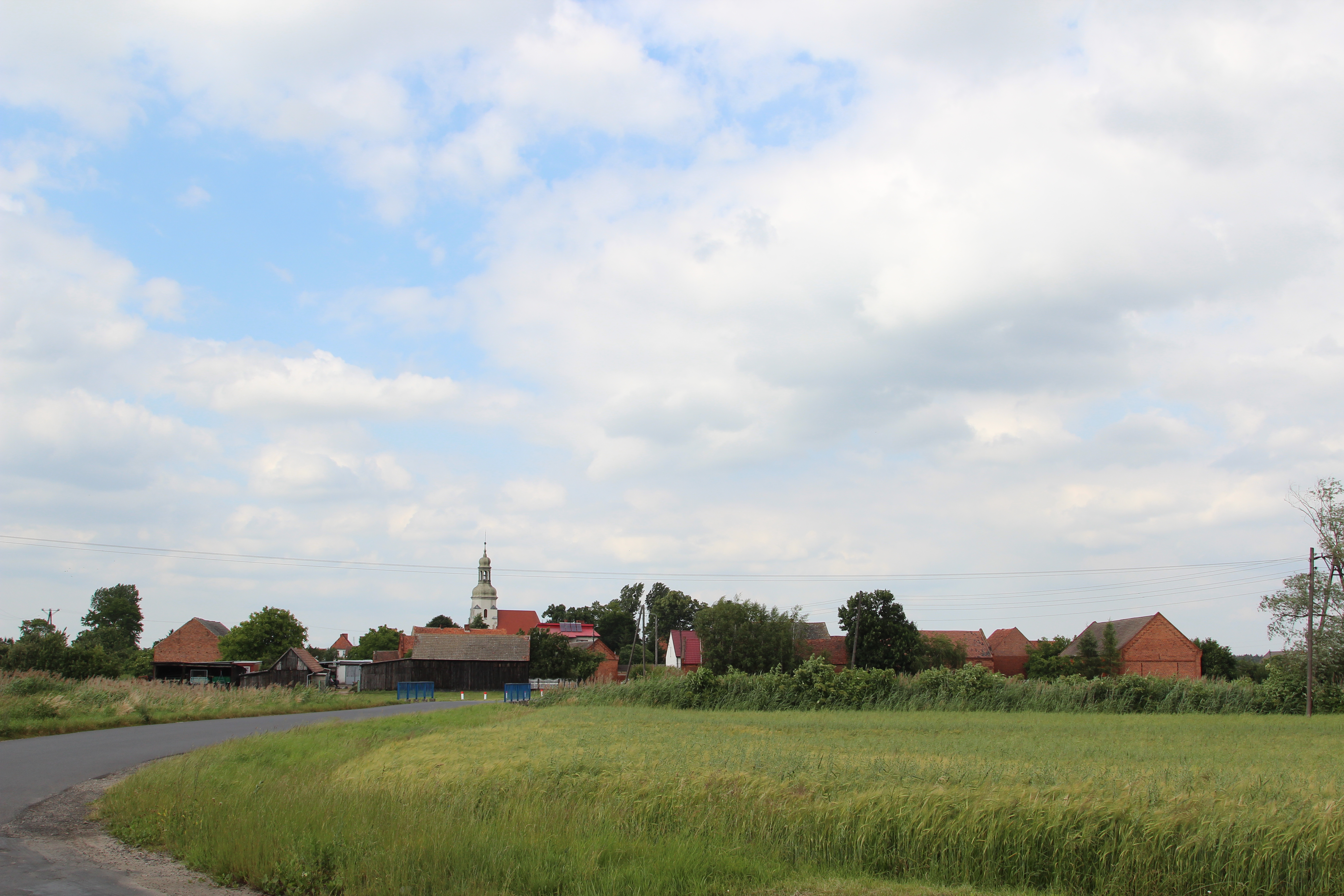

- Location within Poland
- Coordinates: 51°28′46″N 16°51′05″E
- Country: Poland
- Voivodeship: Lower Silesian
- County: Trzebnica
- Gmina: Żmigród
- Population: 410

Bychowo [bɨˈxɔvɔ] is a village in the administrative district of Gmina Żmigród, within Trzebnica County, Lower Silesian Voivodeship, in south-western Poland.
