= Laskow =

Laskow may refer to the following places in Poland:

- Łasków, Lublin Voivodeship
- Lasków, Masovian Voivodeship
- Lasków, Świętokrzyskie Voivodeship
