= Paul Würtz =

German officer and diplomat

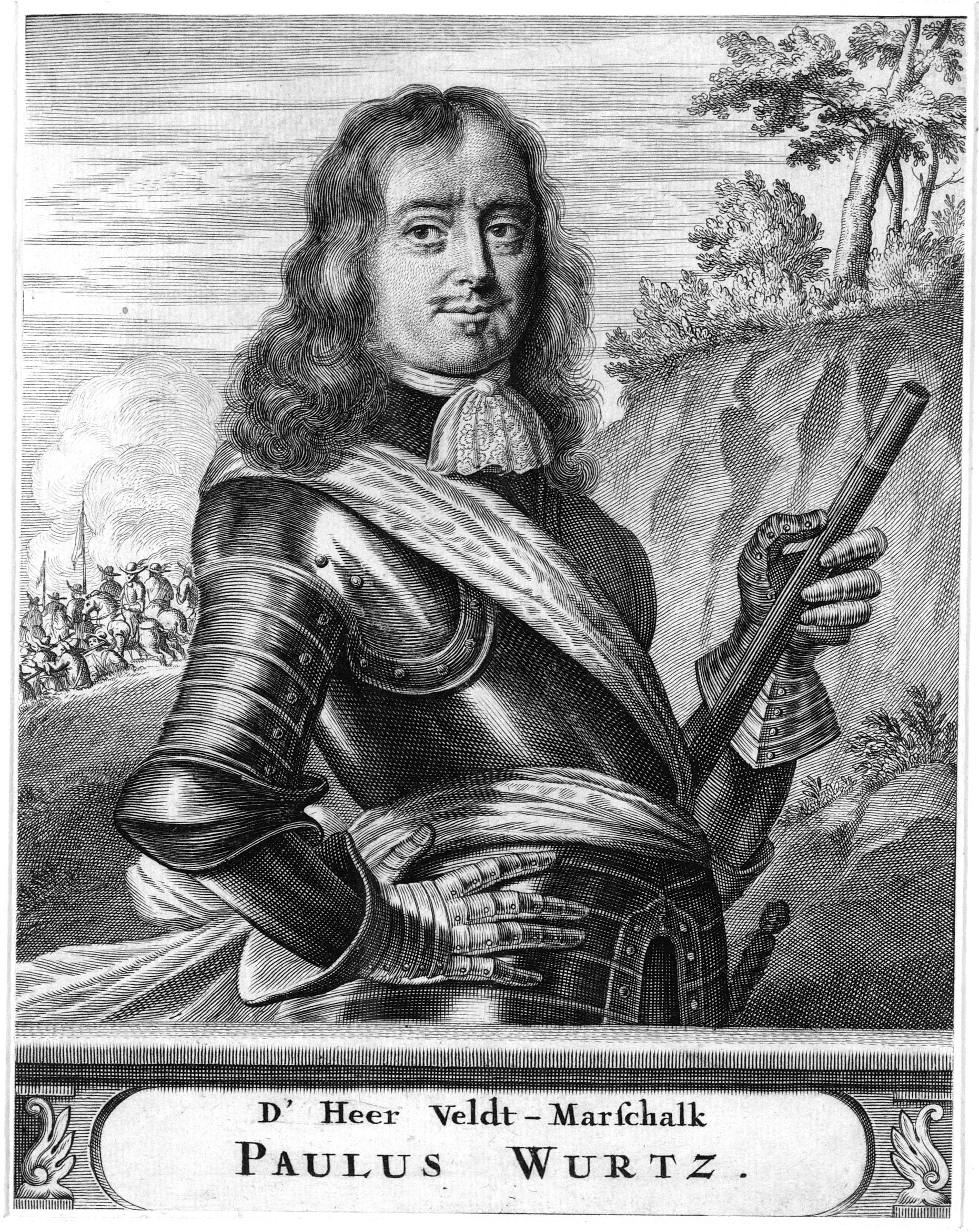
Anonymous portrait of Paul Würtz

Paul Würtz (also Paulus, and Würz Wertz or Wirtz) (30 October 1612 - 23 March 1676) was a German officer and diplomat, who at various times was in German, Swedish, Danish, and Dutch service.

== Life ==
He was born in Husum, Dithmarschen.

During his tenure as governor of Cracow, during Swedish-Transylvanian occupation of the city between 1655–1657, he is renowned for looting and destruction of many priceless works of art, including a silver sarcophagus of Saint Stanislaus dating to 1630 and a silver altar created in 1512, both from the Wawel Cathedral.

He was a Swedish Pomeranian general major and commander of the Stettin fortress from 1657 to 1659. With his 2,600 men garrison he successfully withstood a siege by Austro–Brandenburgian troops in 1659. He also led an offensive into Ducal Prussia in early 1659. During the siege of Stettin, he captured a column of wagons carrying munitions in a nightly raid. The Brandenburgians and Austrians lifted the siege and withdrew early November 1659. From 1661 to 1664, he was vice governor of Swedish Pomerania.

On his death, at Hamburg, he supposedly left a large fortune and a will which was disputed. Legal claims on the estate continued into the 20th century.

== Gallery ==
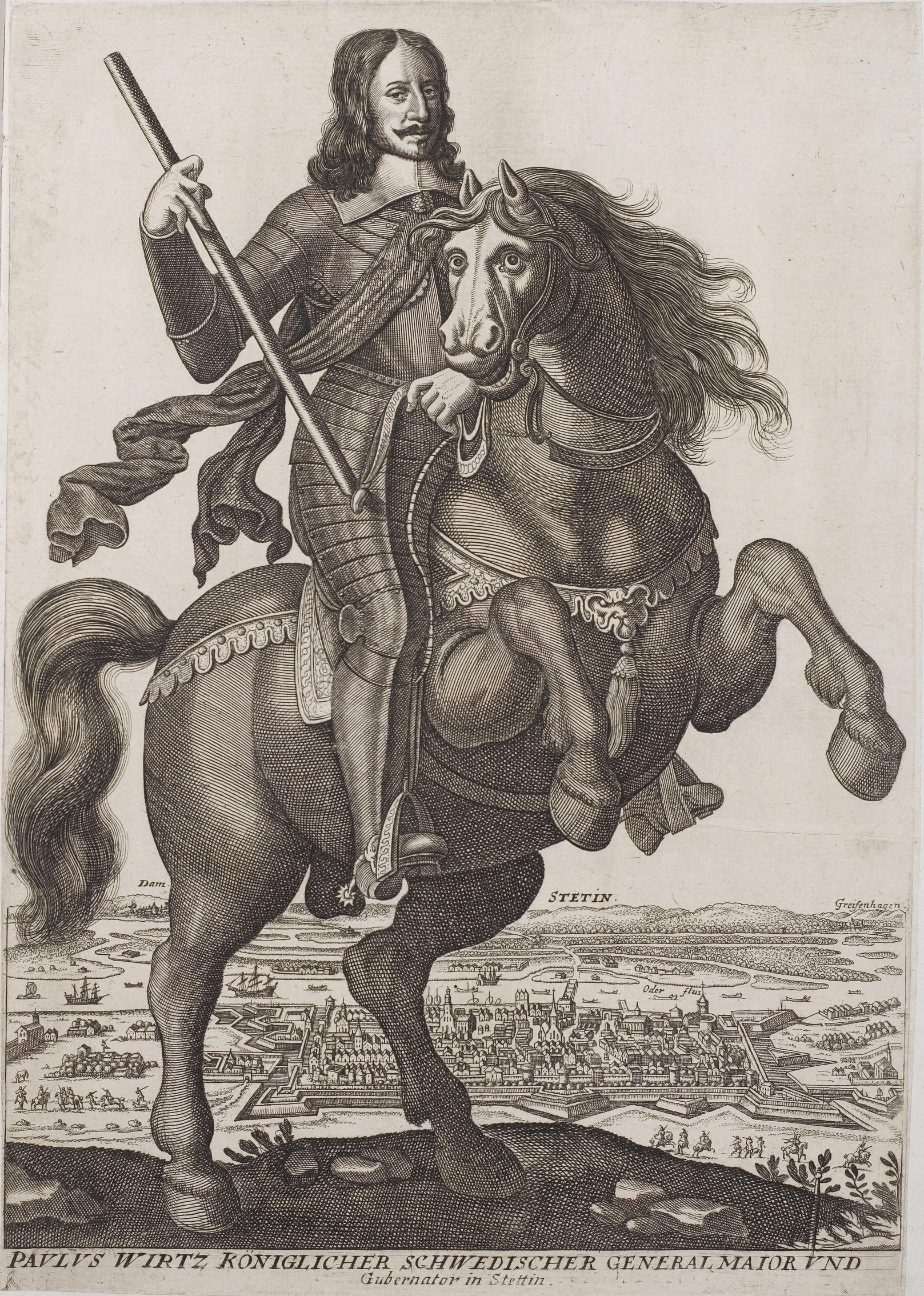
Paul Würtz on horseback against panorama of Szczecin

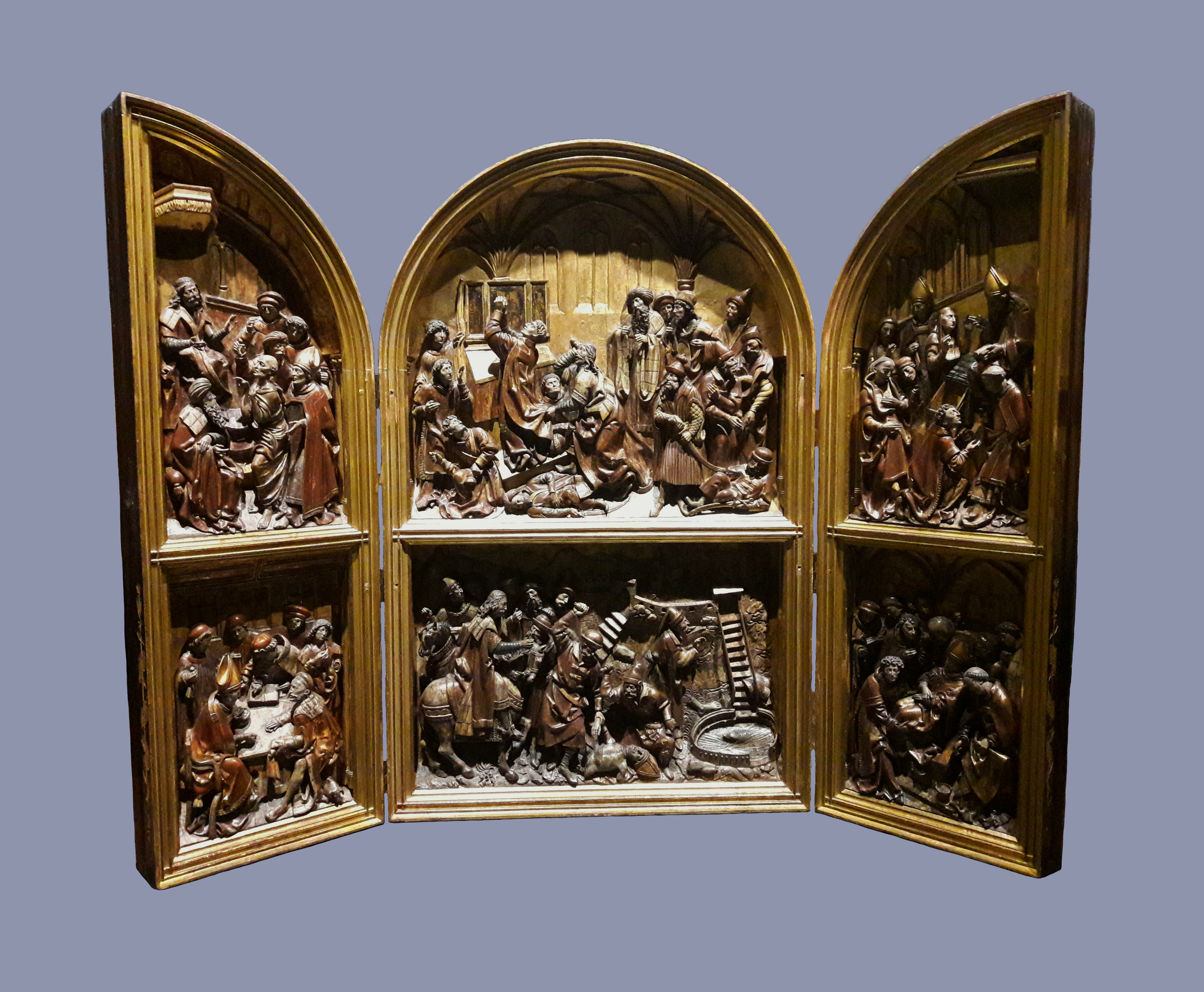
Wooden model of the silver altar of Saint Stanislaus, ca. 1512. The silver altar was destroyed in 1657.

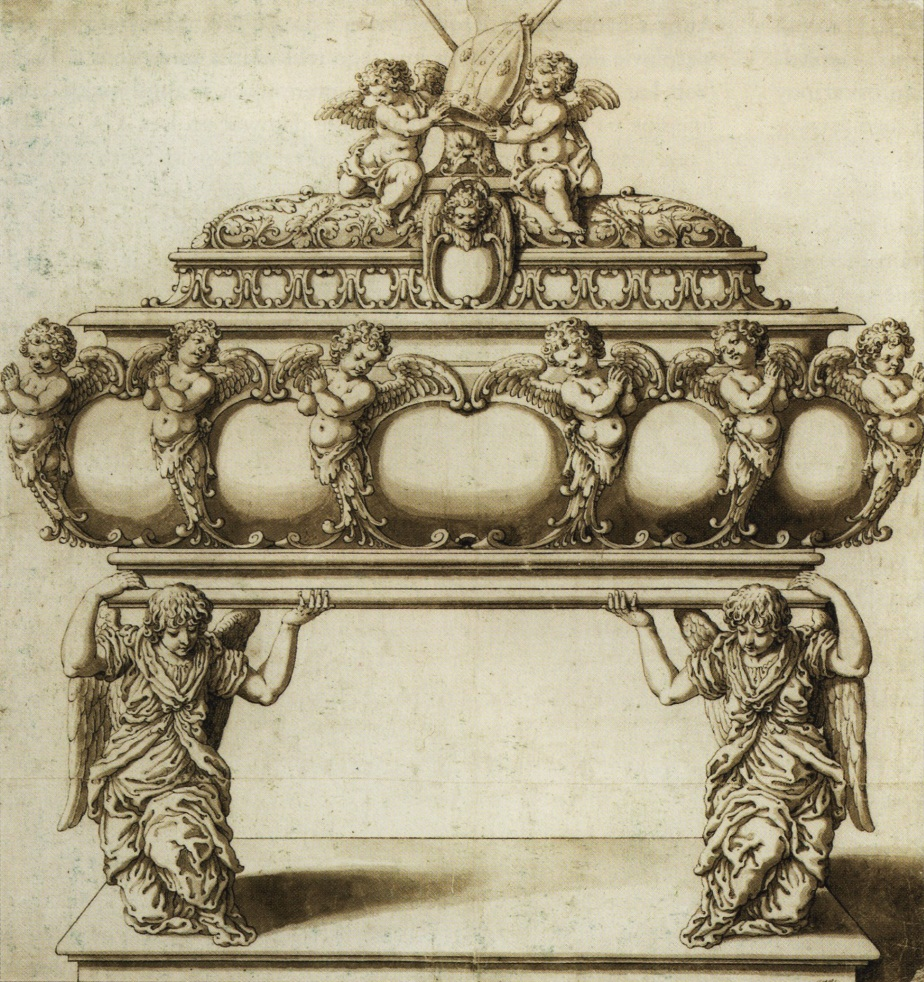
Design for the silver sarcophagus of Saint Stanislaus, ca. 1630. The sarcophagus was destroyed in 1657.

== Sources ==
- Werner Buchholz, Pommern, Siedler, 1999, pp. 274,276, ISBN 3-88680-272-8
- von Essen, Michael Fredholm (2023). The Danish Wars, 1657-1660. Charles X's Wars. Vol. 3. Helion & Company. ISBN 9781915113603.

== See also ==
- Swedish Pomerania
- History of Pomerania
