= Barkowo, Lower Silesian Voivodeship =

Barkowo
- Village
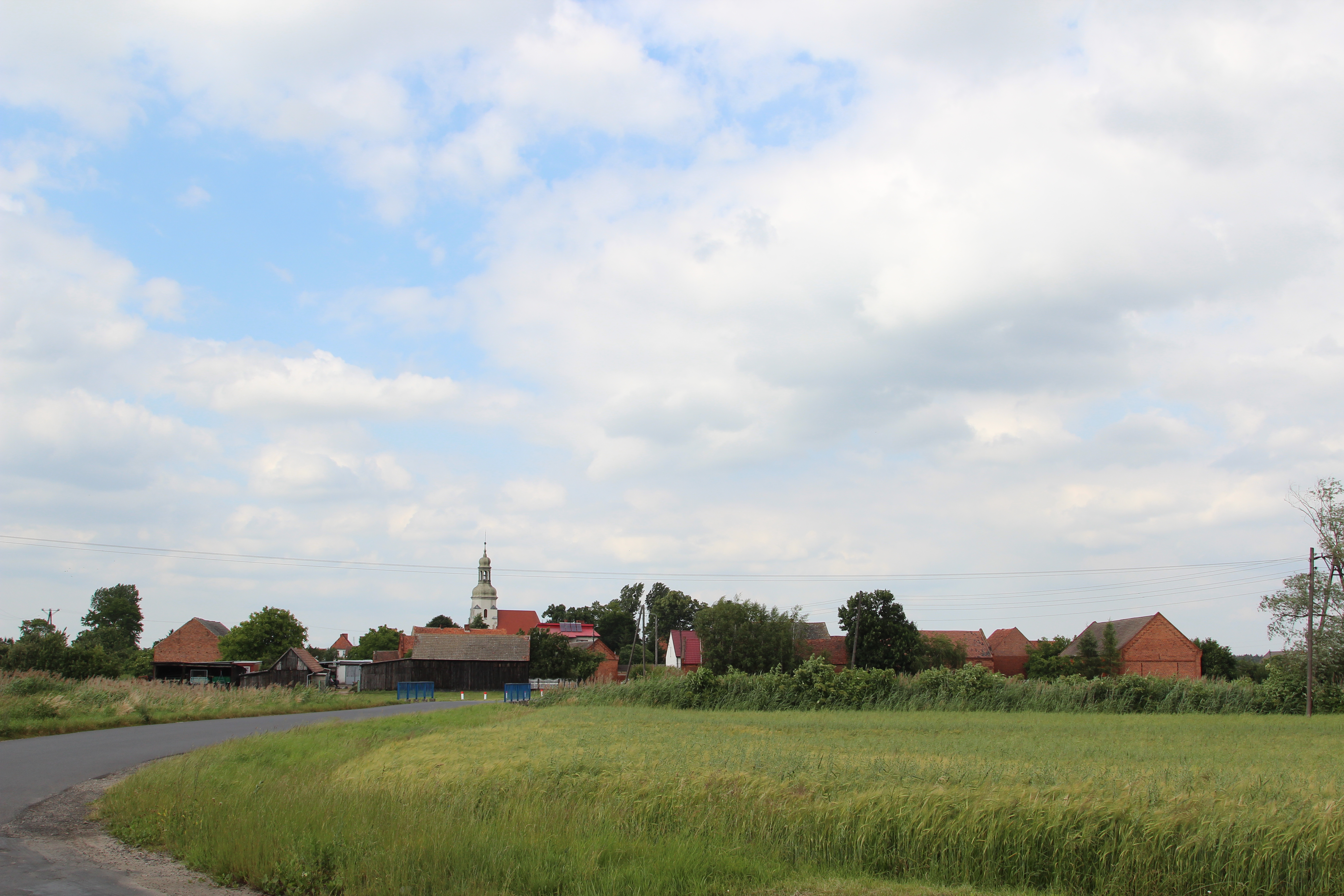

- Location within Poland
- Coordinates: 51°28′35″N 16°47′53″E
- Country: Poland
- Voivodeship: Lower Silesian
- County: Trzebnica
- Gmina: Żmigród

Barkowo [barˈkɔvɔ] is a village in the administrative district of Gmina Żmigród, within Trzebnica County, Lower Silesian Voivodeship, in south-western Poland.
