= Zentralfriedhof (Erlangen) =

Coordinates: 49.5892°N 10.9976°E

Zentralfriedhof Erlangen (Erlangen Central Cemetery)
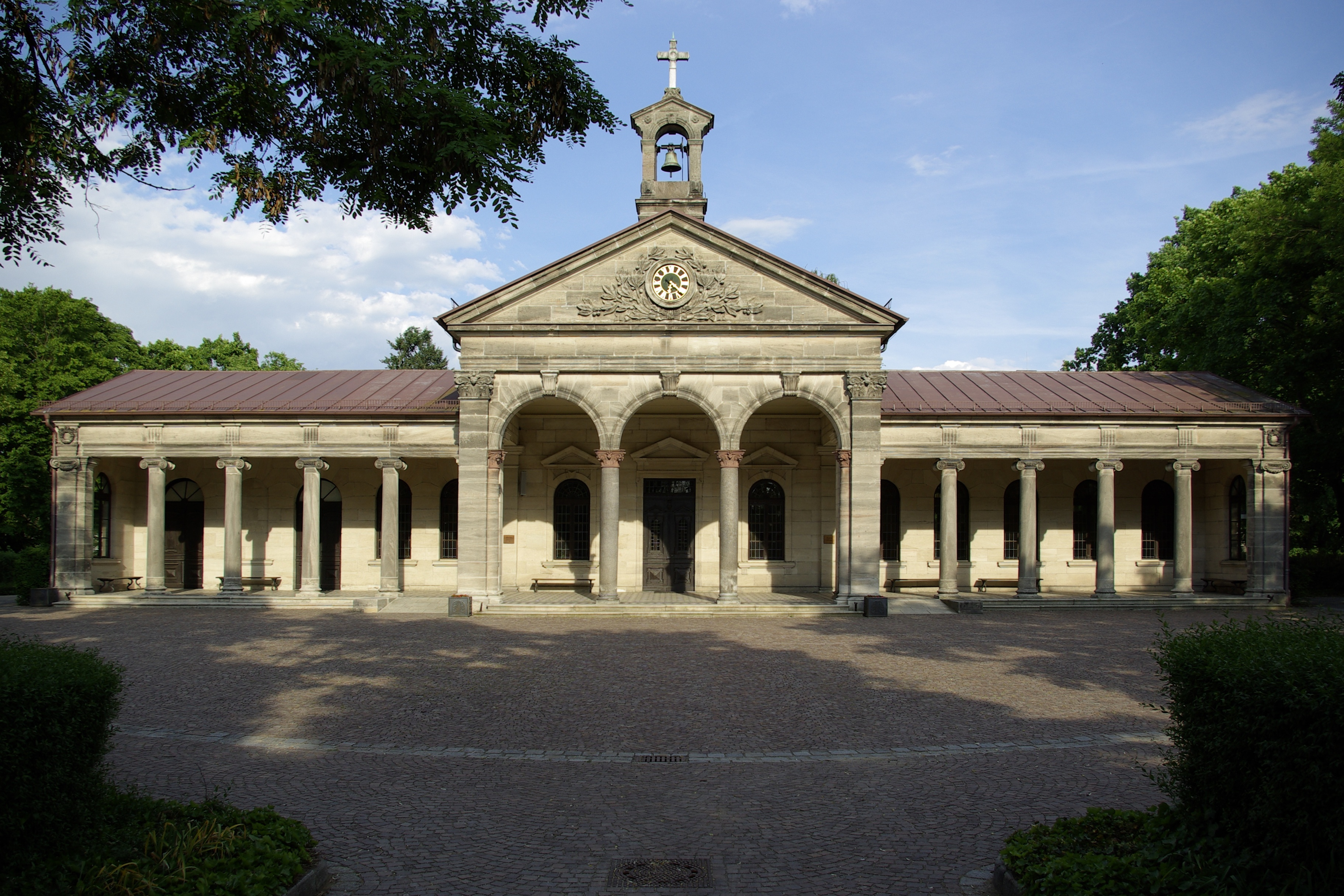
- Mortuary Chapel of the Erlangen Central Cemetery

Details
- Established: 1890s
- Location: Erlangen, Germany
- Size: 60,000 square meters
- Find a Grave: Zentralfriedhof Erlangen

The Erlangen Central Cemetery (German: Zentralfriedhof Erlangen) (also known as the Municipal Cemetery (German: Städtischer Friedhof)) is an urban cemetery in Erlangen. With an area of approximately 60,000 square meters and about 9,000 graves, it is the largest cemetery in the middle Franconian city. Its burial district today includes the core city of Erlangen (east of the Regnitz) as well as the districts of Sieglitzhof and Tennenlohe.

== History ==
After Erlangen's first municipal cemetery, located at the site of the current Ehrenfriedhof, became too small due to population growth, the Central Cemetery was built in the 1890s further out of town on a plot of land covering approximately 50,000 square meters on Brucker Anger. The construction cost amounted to around 90,000 marks, and the cemetery, open to all denominations and the deceased from the mental health and care institutions, was inaugurated on September 26, 1895. Initially, the cemetery wall enclosed only three sides of the area.

Between 1916 and 1921, the Central Cemetery became the final resting place for Russian, Italian, and French soldiers who had died in the Erlangen prisoner-of-war camp. The deceased of the latter two nationalities were repatriated to their home countries in 1926. However, the Russian inmates of the camp had already erected a two-meter-high granite memorial stone with Cyrillic inscriptions for their comrades in the summer of 1919. Their individual graves were consolidated in 1929, and the remains were placed in two sarcophagi made of artificial stone, which were placed on either side of the memorial stone.

In 1927, the Central Cemetery was first expanded to the east. In 1944/45, it was extended to the south up to Fließbachstraße. The most recent expansion to the east, extending to Michael-Vogel-Straße, took place in 1957. The flower kiosk next to the main entrance was built in 1954. In February 1962, the new building of the municipal Garden and Cemetery Office (part of the Registry Office since 1996) was inaugurated in the northeast corner of the Central Cemetery. In May 1998, a new columbarium was consecrated.

== Description ==
The Central Cemetery is located at Äußere Brucker Straße 53, one of Erlangen's main thoroughfares, about one kilometer southwest of the historic city center. It extends almost 300 meters from north to south and around 250 meters east to west.

In addition to approximately 225 casualties of World War II and four members of the long-standing U.S. garrison stationed in Erlangen, the Central Cemetery also houses numerous public figures. Among them are professors from Friedrich-Alexander University, such as Isidor Rosenthal, Leo Hauck, Otto Goetze, and Heinrich Franke, as well as former mayors Michael Poeschke, Friedrich Sponsel, and Heinrich Lades.

== Notable buildings ==
Notable among the often historically styled gravestones from the late 19th and early 20th centuries is the cemetery gate, which was built around 1895 in the same style. The round-arched gate made of sandstone blocks is flanked by two round pillars and crowned with a triangular gable decorated with a seashell. At the top stands a large cross. The south and west walls of the cemetery, adorned with numerous memorial plaques and tombs, date from the same period.

The mortuary chapel, a single-story sandstone block building with a pitched roof, was also built around 1895. The front entrance on the west side is emphasized by arcades resting on round columns and a gable with a bell tower and clock. Along the west facade, there is a colonnade with Ionic capitals on both sides of the entrance area.

In 1994, the mortuary chapel was equipped with an organ from the company Deininger & Renner.

== Bibliography ==
- (in German) Christoph Friederich, Bertold Freiherr von Haller, Andreas Jakob (ed.): Erlanger Stadtlexikon. W. Tümmels Verlag, Nürnberg 2002, ISBN 3-921590-89-2
