= Hahlweg =

Hahlweg is a German surname. Notable people with the surname include:

- Barbara Hahlweg (born 1968), German journalist
- Dietmar Hahlweg (born 1934), German politician
