= Wilkowa =

Wilkowa may refer to the following places in Poland:

- Wilkowa, Lower Silesian Voivodeship (south-west Poland)
- Wilkowa, Świętokrzyskie Voivodeship (south-central Poland)
