= Górowo =

Górowo may refer to:

- Górowo, Lower Silesian Voivodeship (south-west Poland)
- Górowo, Nidzica County in Warmian-Masurian Voivodeship (north Poland)
- Górowo, Olsztyn County in Warmian-Masurian Voivodeship (north Poland)
- Górowo Iławeckie, in Warmian-Masurian Voivodeship (north Poland)
