= Hetzer (surname) =

Hetzer is a surname. Notable people with the surname include:

- Heidi Hetzer (1937–2019), German business owner and manager and rally driver
- Ludwig Haetzer (1500–1529), also spelled Hetzer, Swiss Anabaptist
- Martin Hetzer, Austrian molecular biologist
- Nicole Hetzer (born 1979), German medley swimmer
