= Heute =

German TV news program

heute
- Also known as: heute+ (late-night; until 2020) heute in europa (Today in Europe, 16:00) heute in deutschland (Today in Germany, 14:00) heute Xpress (short bulletins)
- Presented by: Jana Pareigis; Mitri Sirin; Barbara Hahlweg
- Country of origin: Germany
- Original language: German

Production
- Producer: ZDF
- Production location: Mainz
- Running time: Main bulletin: 20 minutes

Original release
- Network: ZDF
- Release: 1 April 1963 – present

Related
- heute-journal (1978–present)

heute (German pronunciation: [ˈhoʏtə]; German for today) is a television news program on the German channel ZDF. The main program is broadcast at 19:00, and includes news, with an emphasis on political news from Germany, Europe and the world, plus 'mixed' news from cultural life or entertainment, and the sports news with an extra presenter. The weather forecast comes up at about 19:22 after a break with commercials. For many years, the opening sequence of each broadcast featured an analogue clock, a signature element of the program. On 19 July 2021; the opening sequence switched to a digital clock along with updated graphics and music, along with a new anchor desk and set.

The newscast heute of ZDF and the 20:00-Tagesschau of Das Erste are the main broadcasts of German public TV starting the evening programme. Advertisements can not be shown on public television in Germany after 8:00 pm.

== History ==
The first heute broadcast took place on 1 April 1963, the day ZDF itself started broadcasting.

heute was originally broadcast from 19:30 to 20:00 CET; on 1 February 1965, the show was split into two parts - heute (19:30 to 19:45 CET) and themen des tages (themes/headlines of the day) (19:45 to 20:00 CET). From 1 January 1969 the themen des tages was dropped so the evening programs could start earlier. In 1971, Wibke Bruhns was the first female presenter.

In 1973, its airtime was moved to 19:00, where it remains today. In April 1999 "heute in Europa" (today in Europe) was released and only Europe News a shown. In the year 2000 a new News Show with the name "heute - in Deutschland" (today - in Germany) came up. It shows news only from Germany. It is always 14:00 on ZDF, after the Mittagsmagzin. Since 2021, the main presenters of the 7pm broadcast have been Jana Pareigis, Barbara Hahlweg, and Mitri Sirin.

== Present day ==
The main program usually has a length of 20 minutes (including a weather forecast). It is also broadcast on 3sat. At around 21:45 CET, a longer, more in-depth show called heute-journal is broadcast, which is similar to Tagesthemen airing on Das Erste alongside the Tagesschau.

== Identity ==
Since 1973, the program's title music was preceded by the letters h-e-u-t-e in morse code (···· · ··- - ·). A redesign in 1984 resulted in an incorrect spelling being played out instead (h-e-ü-e ···· · ··-- ·), which was quickly corrected. In 1998, this was integrated with the title music, and the dots and dashes are no longer distinguishable.

On 17 July 2009, a new virtual studio debuted, featuring redesigned graphics and the integration of the title sequence to the studio in most editions.

From 19 July 2021, the virtual studio got redesigned and at the start of the 7 p.m. broadcast, it shows Germany, Europe, and the world before announcing the title and its presenters.

== Presenters ==
7 p.m. edition

Presenter	Years	Role
Petra Gerster	1998 – 26 May 2021	Main presenter
Christian Sievers	8 September 2014 – 30 September 2021	Main presenter
Jana Pareigis	27 July 2021 – present	Main presenter
Mitri Sirin	11 October 2021 – present	Main presenter
Barbara Hahlweg	2007–present	Relief presenter

Sports news

Presenter	Years
Norbert König	1987–present
Kristin Otto	1995–present
Rudi Cerne	1996–present
Sven Voss	2007–present
Katja Streso	2010–present
Alexander Ruda	2014–present
Norbert Lehmann	2018–present
