= Górowo, Lower Silesian Voivodeship =

Górowo
- Village
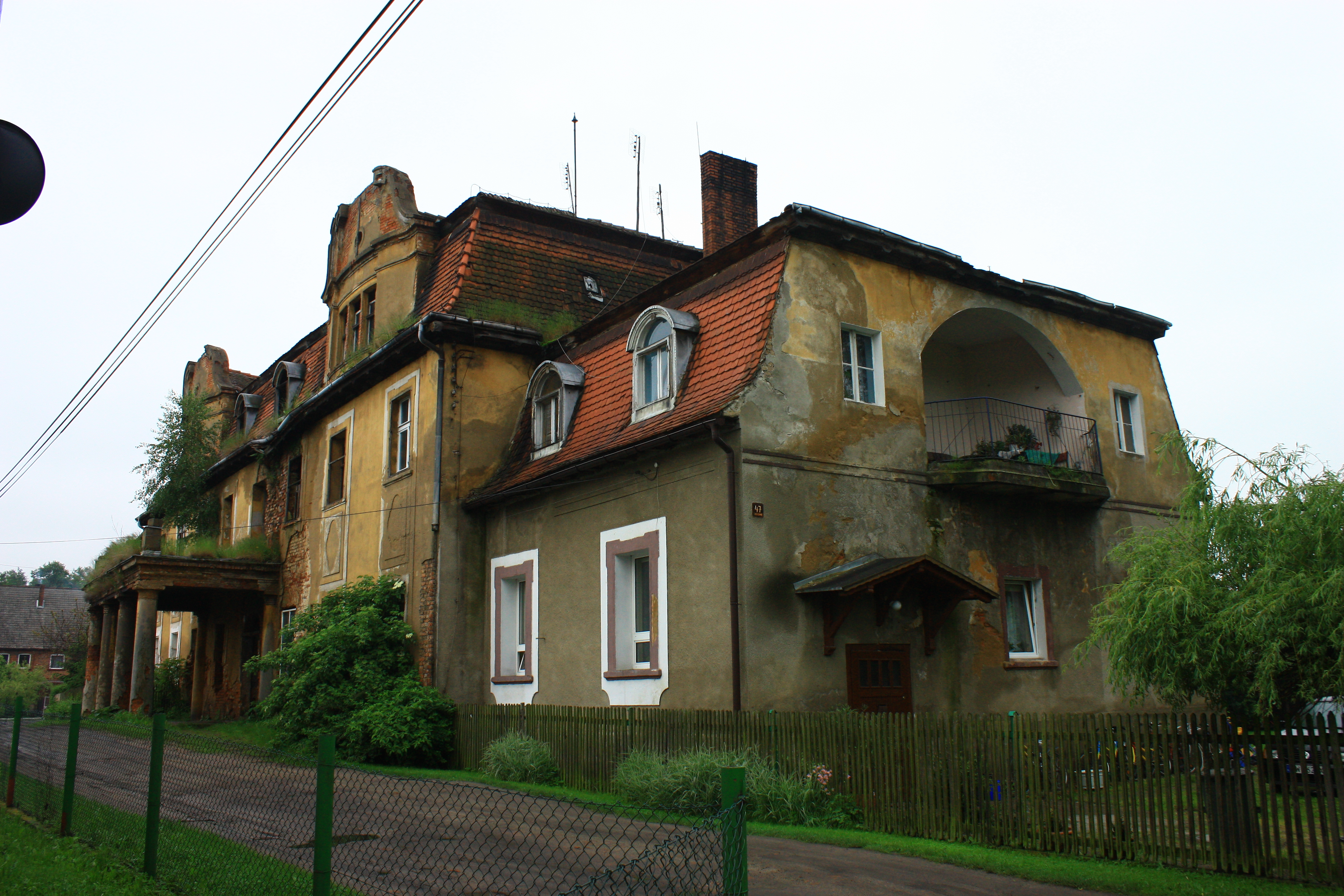
- Palace in Górowo

- Location within Poland
- Coordinates: 51°22′05″N 16°48′14″E
- Country: Poland
- Voivodeship: Lower Silesian
- County: Trzebnica
- Gmina: Prusice

Population (approx.)
  - Total: 400
- Time zone: UTC+1 (CET)
  - Summer (DST): UTC+2 (CEST)
- Vehicle registration: DTR

Górowo [ɡuˈrɔvɔ] is a village in the administrative district of Gmina Prusice, within Trzebnica County, Lower Silesian Voivodeship, in southwestern Poland.

== History ==
The burial grounds of the Bronze Age Lusatian culture from 1000 to 400 BC were discovered on terrains belonging to the village. The first mention of the locality comes from 1297 in which the owner of the village steps out - knight Tyzcho and name - Conradswalde sive Gorowo. The name of the village is of Polish origin and comes from the word góra which means "hill". In the years 1309-1310 an unknown lord from Smardzów had held the law of the higher judiciary in the village. From 1600 to 1772, the owners of the village changed often. It was affirmed in 1780 that the village contained a farm, a church, a school, and 193 inhabitants. In further lists are mentioned a palace, 2 farms, a school, 2 windmills, a distillery, a brewery, 51 houses and 449 inhabitants, of whom 27 were Catholic. The village later expanded towards Strupina; the road leading to Skokowa was also built.

In 1993 there were 380 inhabitants in the village, along with a school, a shop, the inn and the PKS halt. The school was closed in 1998. In 2008 there were roughly 400 inhabitants, roughly 100 houses, 2 shops, a wayside cross and a common room and wayside shrine.
