= Pększyn =

- Village
- Location within Poland
- Coordinates: 51°24′23″N 16°52′13″E
- Country: Poland
- Voivodeship: Lower Silesian
- County: Trzebnica
- Gmina: Prusice

Pększyn [ˈpɛŋkʂɨn] is a village in the administrative district of Gmina Prusice, within Trzebnica County, Lower Silesian Voivodeship, in south-western Poland.
