= Krościna Wielka =

- Village
- Location within Poland
- Coordinates: 51°24′06″N 16°54′44″E
- Country: Poland
- Voivodeship: Lower Silesian
- County: Trzebnica
- Gmina: Prusice
- Time zone: UTC+1 (CET)
  - Summer (DST): UTC+2 (CEST)
- Vehicle registration: DTR

Krościna Wielka [krɔɕˈt͡ɕina ˈvjɛlka] is a village in the administrative district of Gmina Prusice, within Trzebnica County, Lower Silesian Voivodeship, in south-western Poland.
