= Brzeźno, Lower Silesian Voivodeship =

Brzeźno
- Village
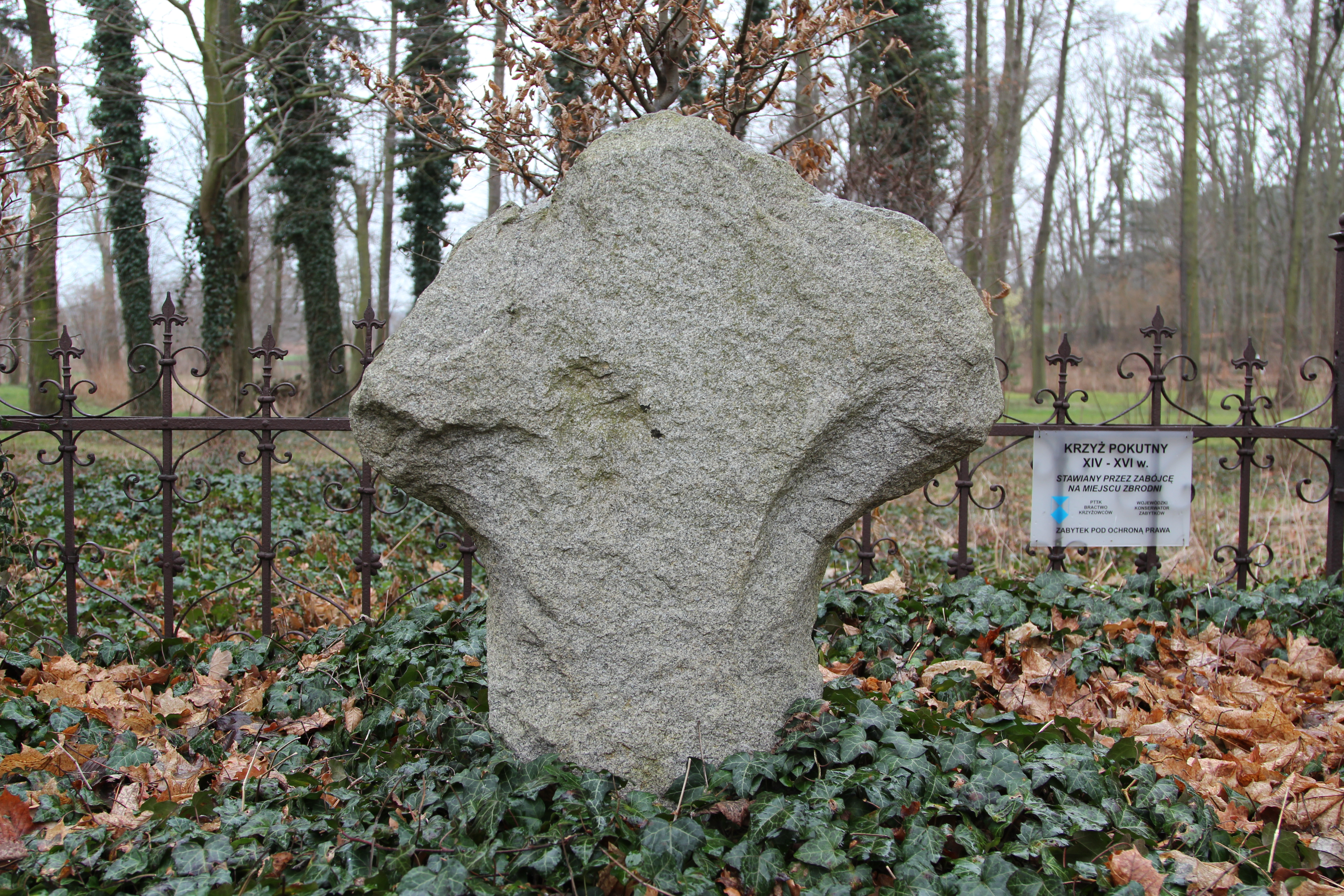

- Location within Poland
- Coordinates: 51°21′45″N 16°52′17″E
- Country: Poland
- Voivodeship: Lower Silesian
- County: Trzebnica
- Gmina: Prusice

Brzeźno [ˈbʐɛʑnɔ] is a village in the administrative district of Gmina Prusice, within Trzebnica County, Lower Silesian Voivodeship, in south-western Poland.
