= Raszowice =

- Village
- Location within Poland
- Coordinates: 51°26′01″N 16°48′37″E
- Country: Poland
- Voivodeship: Lower Silesian
- County: Trzebnica
- Gmina: Prusice

Raszowice [raʂɔˈvit͡sɛ] is a village in the administrative district of Gmina Prusice, within Trzebnica County, Lower Silesian Voivodeship, in south-western Poland.
