= Budzicz =

- Village
- Location within Poland
- Coordinates: 51°22′04″N 16°54′46″E
- Country: Poland
- Voivodeship: Lower Silesian
- County: Trzebnica
- Gmina: Prusice

Budzicz [ˈbud͡ʑit͡ʂ] is a village in the administrative district of Gmina Prusice, within Trzebnica County, Lower Silesian Voivodeship, in south-western Poland.
