= Pietrowice Małe =

- Village
- Location within Poland
- Coordinates: 51°22′57″N 16°57′28″E
- Country: Poland
- Voivodeship: Lower Silesian
- County: Trzebnica
- Gmina: Prusice

Pietrowice Małe [pjɛtrɔˈvit͡sɛ ˈmawɛ] is a village in the administrative district of Gmina Prusice, within Trzebnica County, Lower Silesian Voivodeship, in south-western Poland.
