= Ligota Strupińska =

- Village
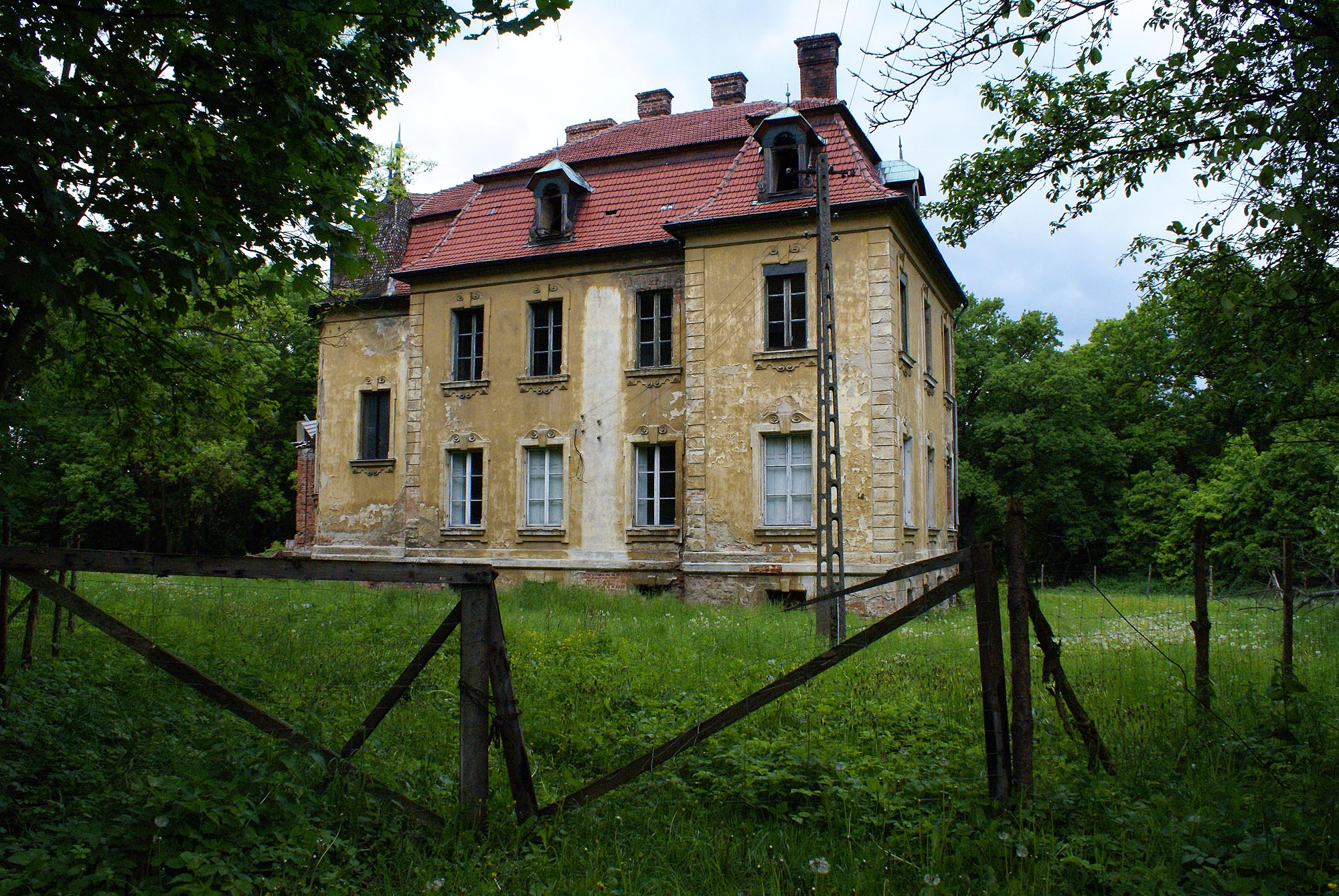
- Palace

- Location within Poland
- Coordinates: 51°24′0″N 16°48′20″E
- Country: Poland
- Voivodeship: Lower Silesian
- County: Trzebnica
- Gmina: Prusice

Ligota Strupińska [liˈɡɔta struˈpiɲska] is a village in the administrative district of Gmina Prusice, within Trzebnica County, Lower Silesian Voivodeship, in south-western Poland.
