= Dębnica, Lower Silesian Voivodeship =

Dębnica
- Village
- Location within Poland
- Coordinates: 51°23′09″N 16°55′45″E
- Country: Poland
- Voivodeship: Lower Silesian
- County: Trzebnica
- Gmina: Prusice

Dębnica [dɛmbˈnit͡sa] is a village in the administrative district of Gmina Prusice, within Trzebnica County, Lower Silesian Voivodeship, in south-western Poland.
