= Borów, Trzebnica County =

Borów
- Village
- Location within Poland
- Coordinates: 51°22′2″N 16°50′56″E
- Country: Poland
- Voivodeship: Lower Silesian
- County: Trzebnica
- Gmina: Prusice

Borów [ˈbɔruf] is a village in the administrative district of Gmina Prusice, within Trzebnica County, Lower Silesian Voivodeship, in south-western Poland.

== Notable residents ==
- Heinrich Freiherr von Lüttwitz (1896–1969), Wehrmacht general
