= Krościna Mała =

- Village
- Location within Poland
- Coordinates: 51°22′33″N 16°56′36″E
- Country: Poland
- Voivodeship: Lower Silesian
- County: Trzebnica
- Gmina: Prusice

Krościna Mała [krɔɕˈt͡ɕina ˈmawa] is a village in the administrative district of Gmina Prusice, within Trzebnica County, Lower Silesian Voivodeship, in south-western Poland.
