= Anton Hammerbacher =

German politician (1871–1956)

Anton Marian August Hammerbacher (22 July 1871, in Munich – 22 October 1956, in Erlangen) was a German politician (SPD) and mayor of Erlangen from 1945 to 1946.

== Mayor of Erlangen ==
On 28 April 1945 Hammerbacher was appointed mayor of Erlangen by the military administration. He resigned on 30 September 1946.

His successor was Michael Poeschke.

== Honors ==
At the end of his term, the township of Erlangen awarded him with the honorary citizenship being followed with the Order of Merit of the Federal Republic of Germany in 1953. A street in Erlangen was given his name in 1960.

== Literature ==
- Haus der Bayerischen Geschichte: Geschichte des Bayerischen Parliaments 1819 – 2003
- Schweigert, Walter/Treuheit, Klaus (Hrsg.): ...daß der Mensch dem Menschen ein Helfer ist. 120 Jahre Sozialdemokratie in Erlangen. Erlangen 1990.
- Christoph Friederich: . In: Christoph Friederich, Bertold Freiherr von Haller, Andreas Jakob (Hrsg.): . W. Tümmels Verlag, Nürnberg 2002, ISBN 3-921590-89-2.
- Gertraud Lehmann: . In: Christoph Friederich, Bertold Freiherr von Haller, Andreas Jakob (Hrsg.): . W. Tümmels Verlag, Nürnberg 2002, ISBN 3-921590-89-2.
- Andreas Jakob: . In: Christoph Friederich, Bertold Freiherr von Haller, Andreas Jakob (Hrsg.): . W. Tümmels Verlag, Nürnberg 2002, ISBN 3-921590-89-2.
