= Piotrkowice, Lower Silesian Voivodeship =

Piotrkowice
- Village
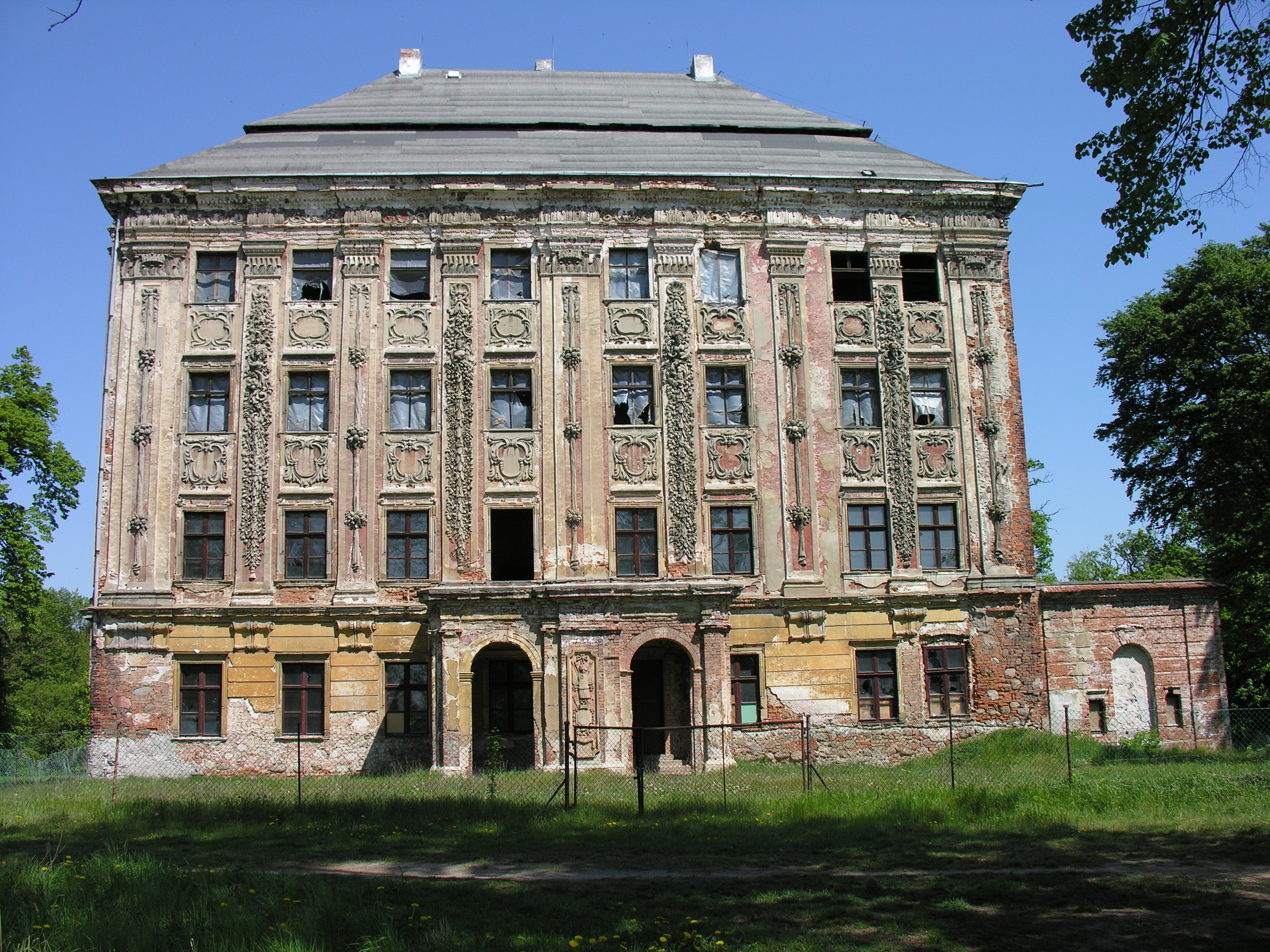
- Palace

- Location within Poland
- Coordinates: 51°24′42″N 16°49′55″E
- Country: Poland
- Voivodeship: Lower Silesian
- County: Trzebnica
- Gmina: Prusice

Piotrkowice [pjɔtrkɔˈvit͡sɛ] is a village in the administrative district of Gmina Prusice, within Trzebnica County, Lower Silesian Voivodeship, in south-western Poland.
