= Heidi Hetzer =

German businesswoman and rally driver (1937–2019)

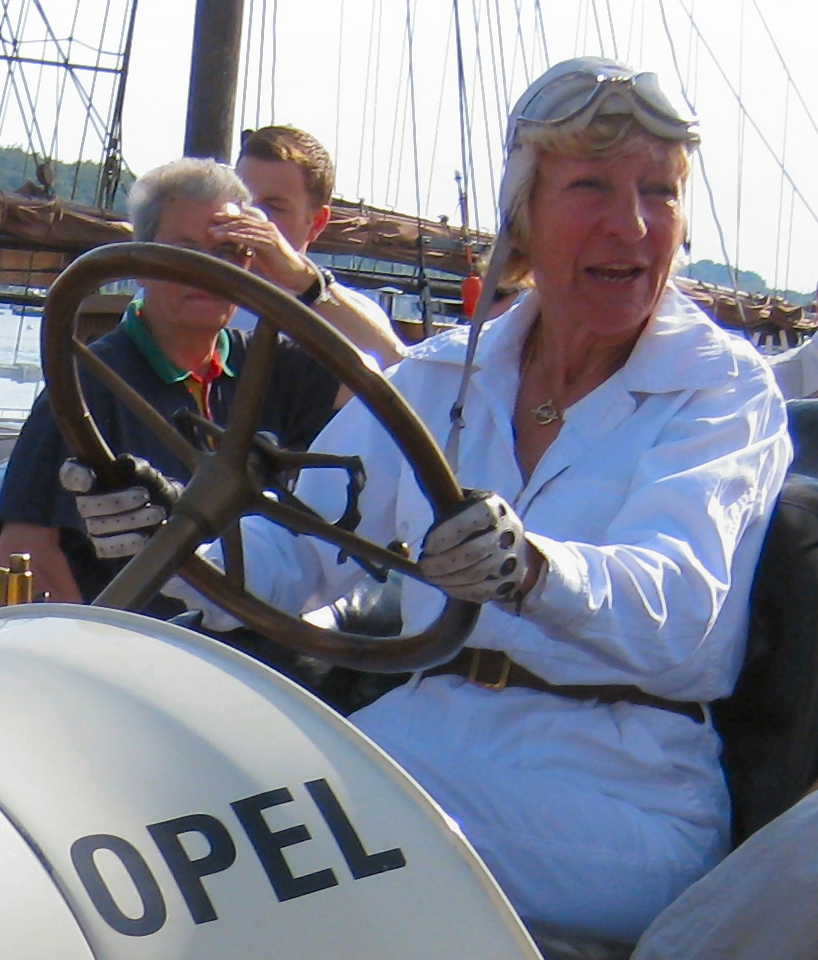
- Hetzer in 2012
- Nationality: (Germany) German
- Born: 20 June 1937 Berlin, Germany
- Died: 21 April 2019 (aged 81) Berlin, Germany

Heidi Hetzer (20 June 1937 – 21 April 2019) was a German businesswoman, manager and rally driver. In obituaries, she was referred to as an "intrepid globetrotter".

== Life ==
Hetzer is the daughter of the entrepreneur Siegfried Hetzer, who founded a Victoria (motorcycle) dealership in Berlin in 1919 and operated an Opel car dealership since 1933. From 1954, she learned the profession of automotive mechanics in the family business. After an attempt to become self-employed at age 21, she worked again in her father's business. At age 31, Hetzer took over the company, based in Berlin-Charlottenburg, in 1969 after the death of her three-year-older sister and her father, which made her the owner and manager of one of the largest car dealerships in Berlin. She managed it until 2012. Since neither her daughter nor son wanted to continue the business, she sold the company.

As one of the few successful businesswomen in her industry and as a racing driver, but also through her social commitment, Hetzer was one of the best-known personalities in Berlin's economy.

Hetzer had a daughter and a son and lived in Charlottenburg.

On 21 April 2019, she was found dead in her apartment, aged 81. Heidi Hetzer was buried in the churchyard of Dorfkirche Gatow (grave site B-1-2) in her hometown.

== Motorsport ==
In 1953, Hetzer first participated in a rally around Müggelberge on a Lambretta scooter, but was disqualified because of foreign help.

Among other things, she participated in the following competitions:

- Mille Miglia from Brescia to Rome and back;
- Monte Carlo Rally;
- Rally Paris - Berlin with a 1911 Opel Rennwagen 8/30;
- Panama-Alaska rally from June 1 to 25, 1997 with a 1969 Opel Kadett B;
- 2000 km through Germany, with a Hispano-Suiza;
- Düsseldorf-Shanghai Rally from 17 August to 28 September 2007 with a 1964 Opel Rekord A Coupe.

In the Carrera Panamericana in Mexico and the Tour d'Europe in 1989, she finished third in each case. In the latter she also won the team ranking with her women's team. An intended participation in the Dakar Rally in 2008 was not possible due to the cancellation of the rally. Their participation plans, which were postponed to the following year, were not implemented. In addition, she regularly took part in regional classic car rallies like the Prinz-Heinrich-Fahrt in Eckernförde.

== World tour ==
On 27 July 2014, she embarked on a voyage around the world from Berlin, following in the footsteps of Clärenore Stinnes with a Hudson Greater Eight from 1930. The passenger was initially the travel photographer, Jordane Schönfelder, but he retired immediately after the start. In Istanbul, Schönfelder was replaced by Patrik Heinrichs of Berlin, but he also left the journey on 18 September 2014 in Tashkent.

The trip took them from Eastern Europe to Tehran, then from China to Australia. On 4 April 2015 she arrived in New Zealand. After transferring to the Americas she drove through Canada and reached the border with the United States at Emerson at the end of August 2015. She drove through the US and South America and then transferred to South Africa August 2016. After a tour of several countries in southern Africa, she returned to Europe on a cargo ship from South Africa, about two and a half years after the trip began. On March 12, 2017, she finished her trip to Berlin and was greeted in front of the Brandenburg Gate by friends, fans and Berlin State Secretary Sawsan Chebli.

Reception for Heidi Hetzer at the Brandenburg Gate

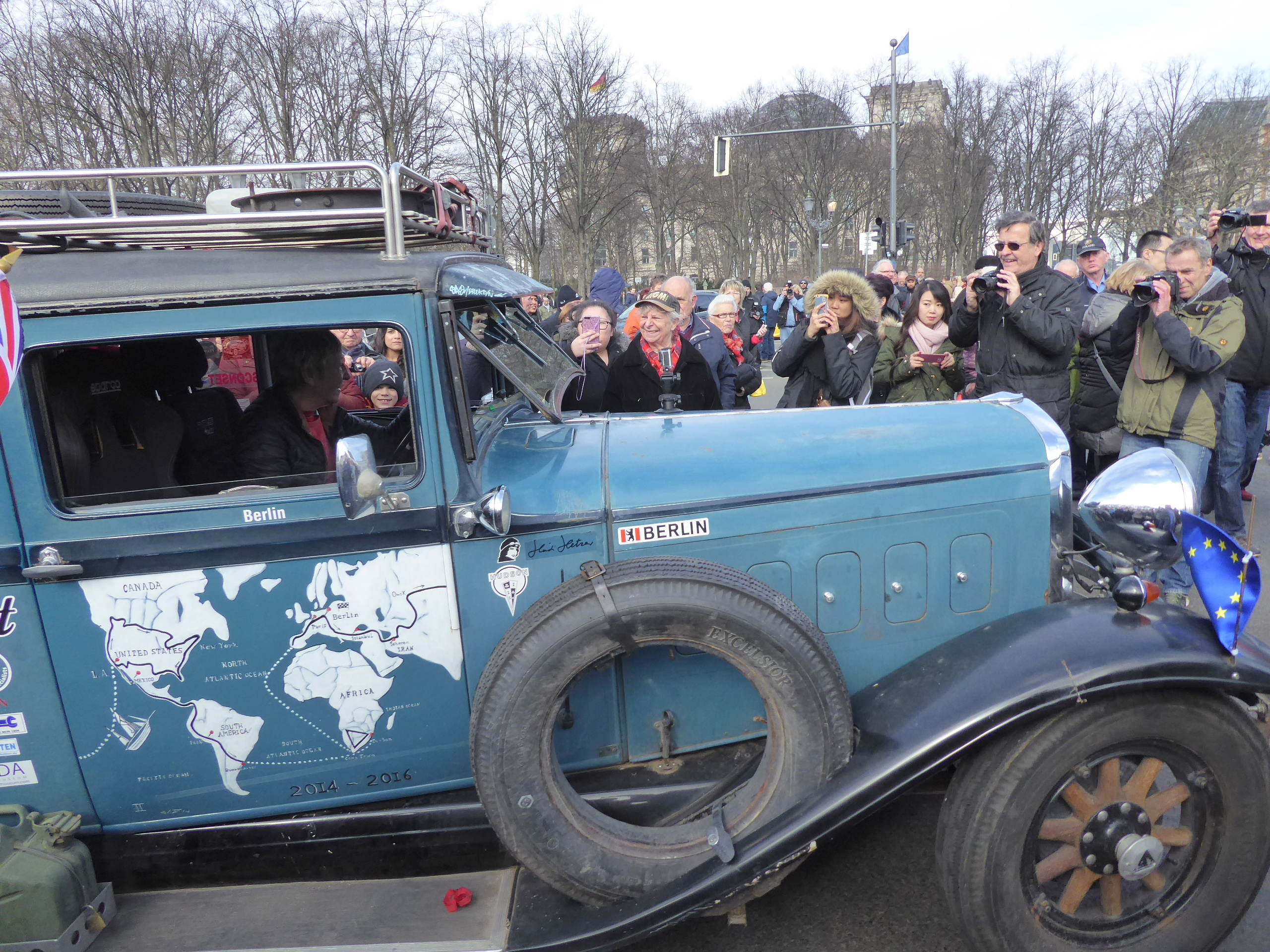
Am Brandenburger Tor im Hudson Greater Eight "Hudo"

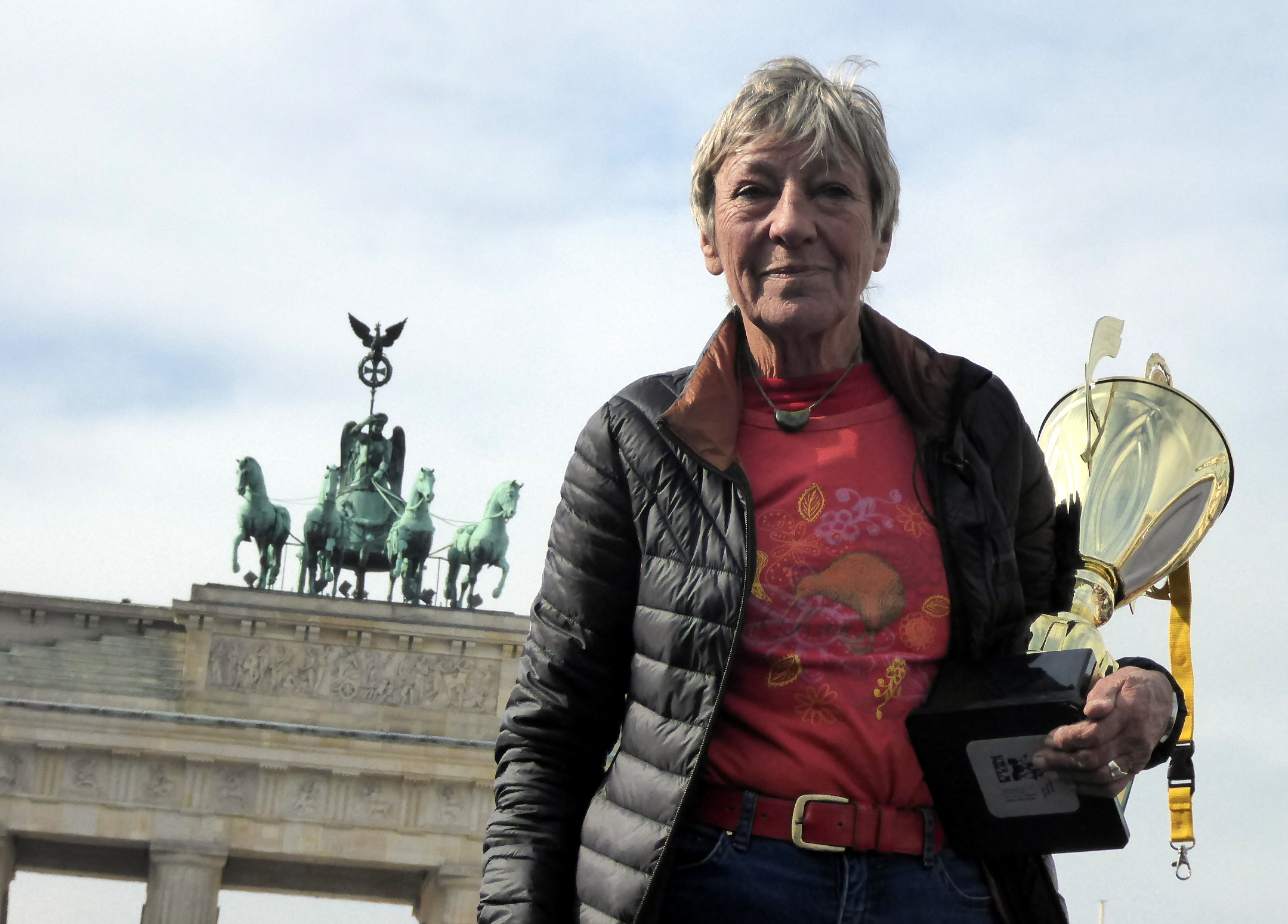
Reception at the Brandenburg Gate

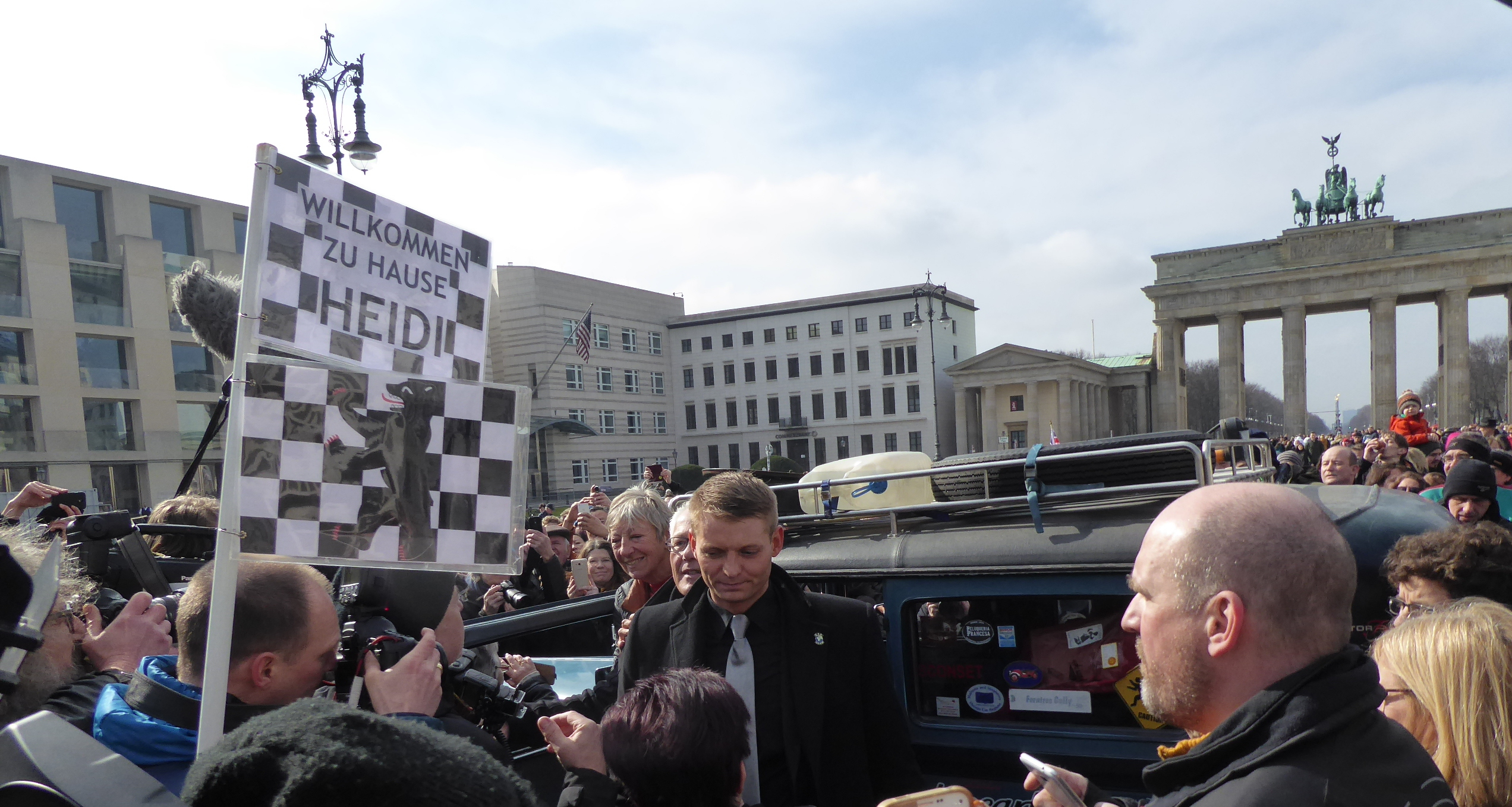
Welcome home Heidi

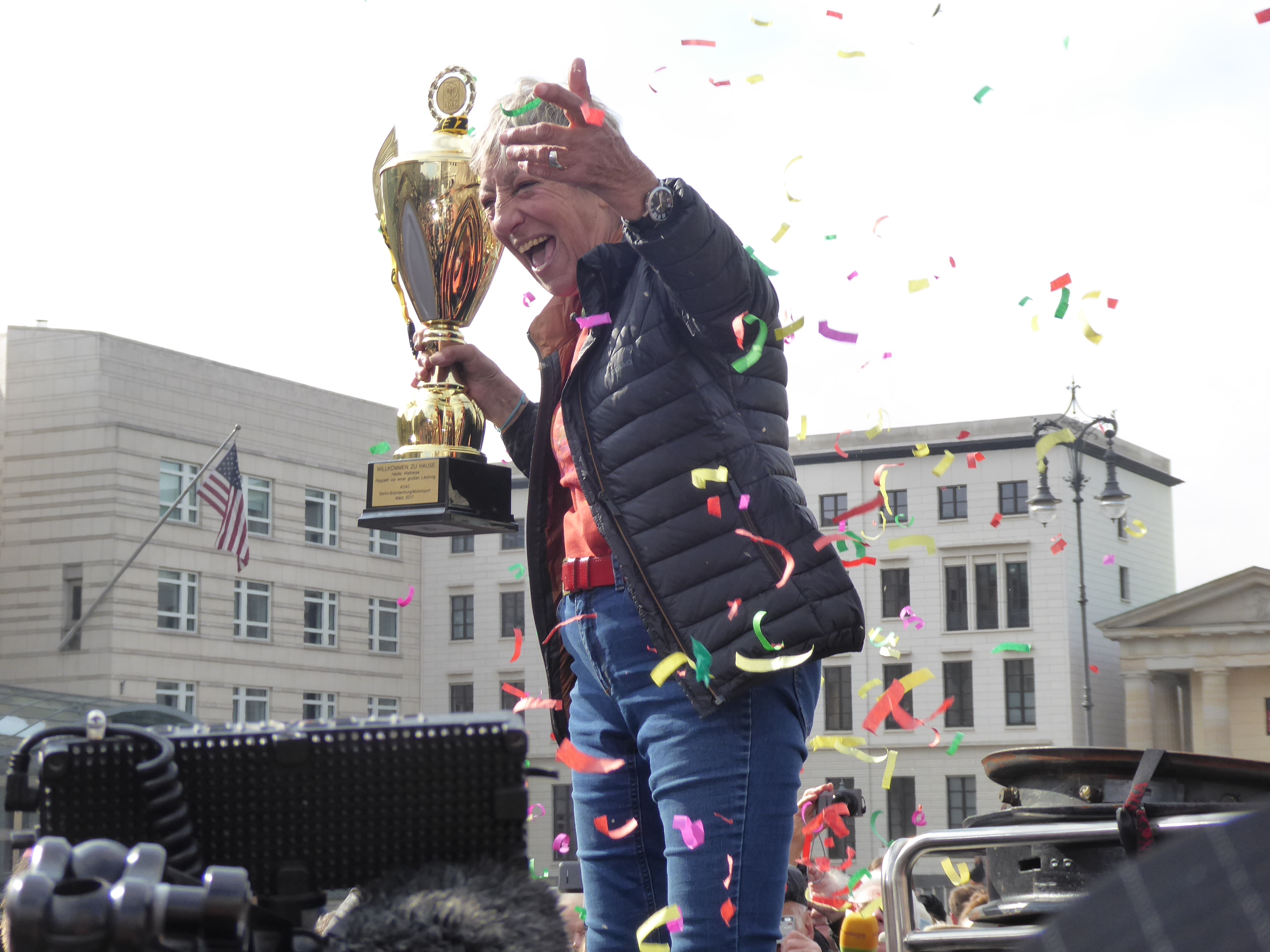
Welcome home Heidi with cup and confetti

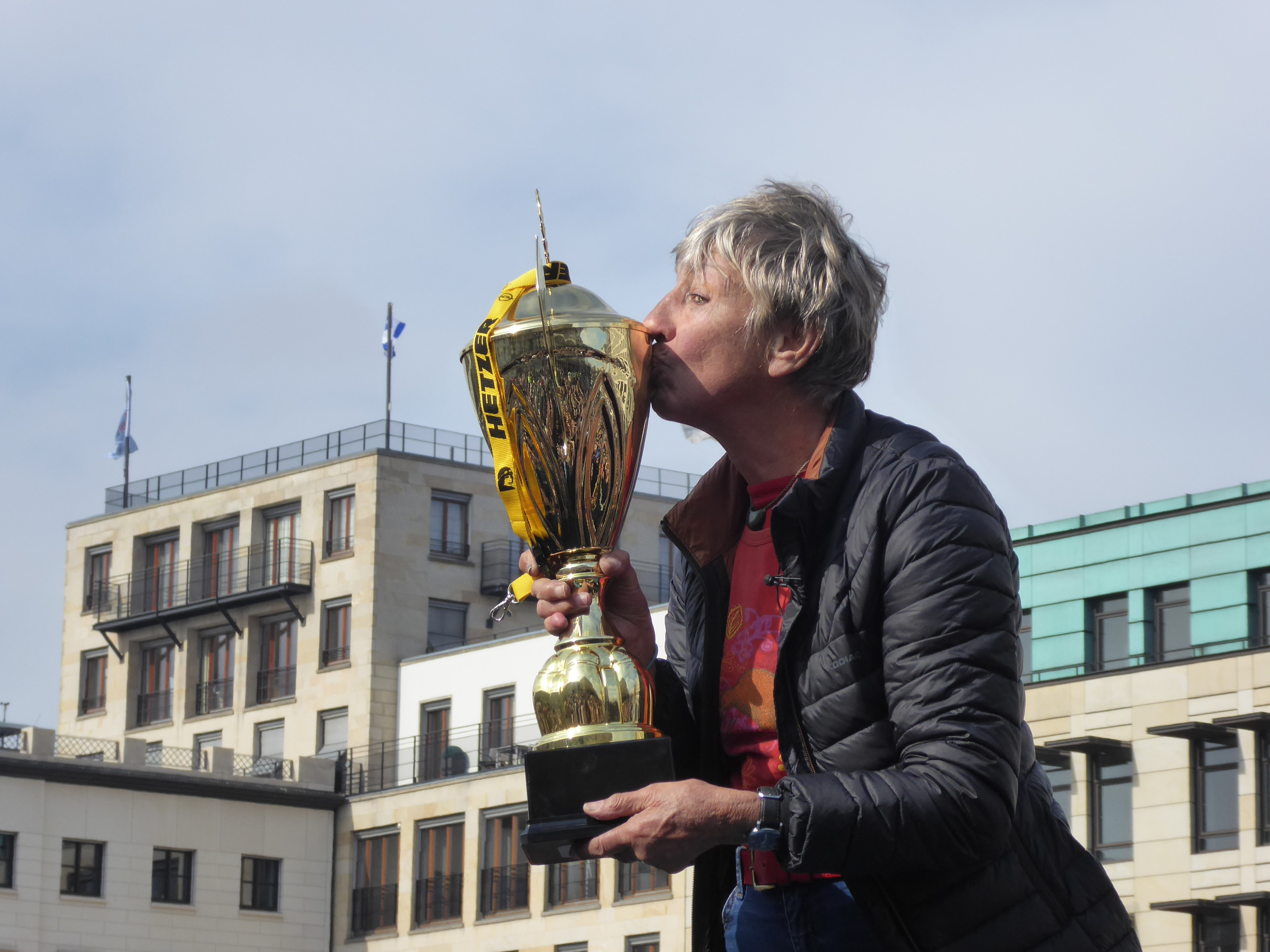
Welcome home Heidi with cup

== Honors ==
For her social engagement, for example for Ein Herz für Kinder, she was honored in 2007 by the Beuth University of Applied Sciences Berlin with the name of an orchid from the genus Phalaenopsis.

In summer 2004, Hetzer was in Berlin and was a bearer of the Olympic torch on its way to the games in Athens.

== Scandal about racist utterance ==
In the ZDF Morgenmagazin on March 13, 2017, Hetzer spoke racially about black people. The subject of her trip around the world, during which she was repeatedly robbed by dark-skinned South Africans:

Like everywhere there are drawbacks - the claws. The blacks steal, if they see only a jacket, an ole jacket. They steal everything.

On 14 March 2017, she apologized in an interview with B.Z.: "That was a mistake. I apologize for this statement. How can I make amends?". Her statement refers to a surveillance video in which four dark-skinned South Africans stole their navigation system from the locked vintage car. Furthermore, in Cape Town the golden Berlin bear had been ripped off her neck by a black man and her car was completely vacated in St. Lucia. The presenter of the morning magazine, Jana Pareigis, also commented on Facebook on the incident and condemned the statements as false, racially stereotyped and hurtful. However, she hopes that the interview will at least lead to racist prejudice being discussed.
