= Gola, Trzebnica County =

Gola
- Village
- Location within Poland
- Coordinates: 51°21′07″N 16°55′56″E
- Country: Poland
- Voivodeship: Lower Silesian
- County: Trzebnica
- Gmina: Prusice

Gola [ˈɡɔla] is a village in the administrative district of Gmina Prusice, within Trzebnica County, Lower Silesian Voivodeship, in south-western Poland.
