= Prusice =

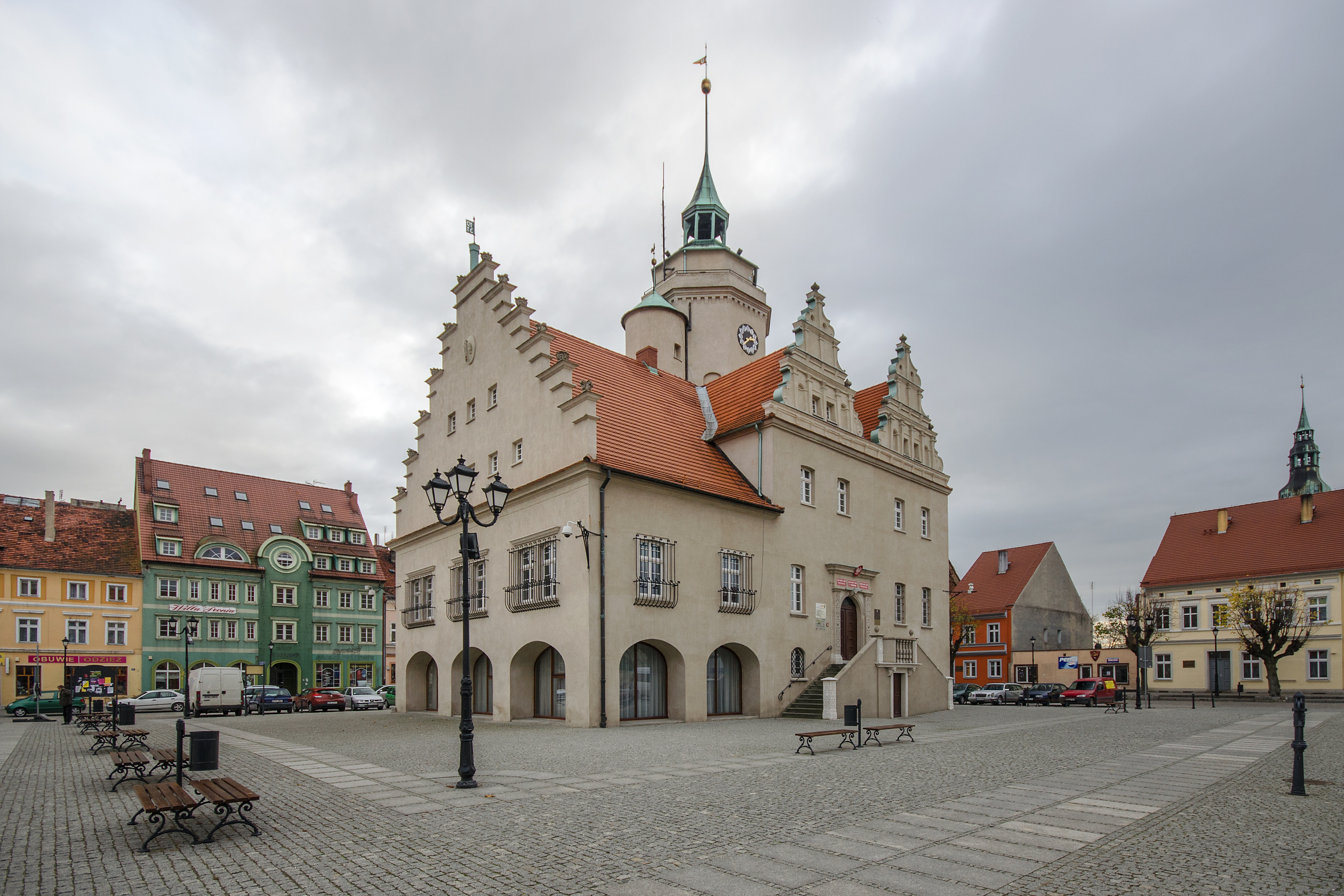
- Town Hall at the Market Square

- Flag Coat of arms

- Location within Poland
- Coordinates: 51°22′16″N 16°57′43″E
- Country: Poland
- Voivodeship: Lower Silesian
- County: Trzebnica
- Gmina: Prusice
- Town rights: 1287

Area
  - Total: 10.94 km^{2} (4.22 sq mi)

Population (2019-06-30)
  - Total: 2,243
  - Density: 205.0/km^{2} (531.0/sq mi)
- Time zone: UTC+1 (CET)
  - Summer (DST): UTC+2 (CEST)
- Postal code: 55-110
- Vehicle registration: DTR

Prusice [pruˈɕit͡sɛ] (German: Prausnitz) is a town in Trzebnica County, Lower Silesian Voivodeship, in south-western Poland. It is the seat of the administrative district (gmina) called Gmina Prusice.

As of 2019, the town has a population of 2,243.

== Geography ==
Prusice lies approximately 4.5 mi (7 km) north of the regional capital Wrocław.

== History ==
Prusice was mentioned as a market settlement with a church in 1253. It was granted town rights in 1287 by Duke Henry Probus. It was ravaged by the Hussites in 1432. Following the Reformation, the local church was Lutheran from 1594 to 1654. The town suffered during the Thirty Years' War in 1640–1642. In 1842, the town had a population of 2,429.

== Sights ==
Among the historic sights of Prusice are the Market Square (Rynek), the Renaissance Town Hall (Ratusz) and the churches of St. James and St. Joseph.

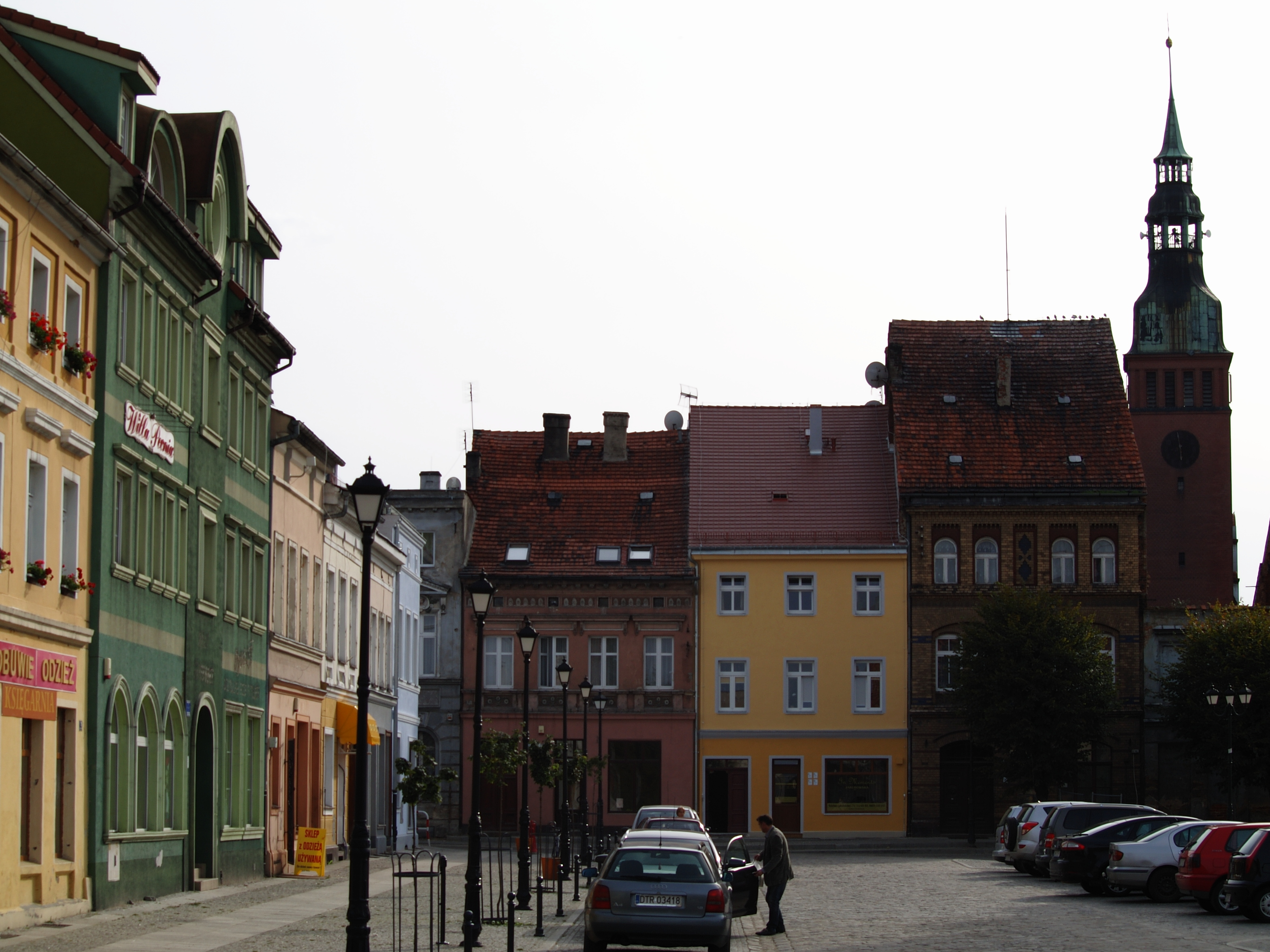
Market Square (Rynek)

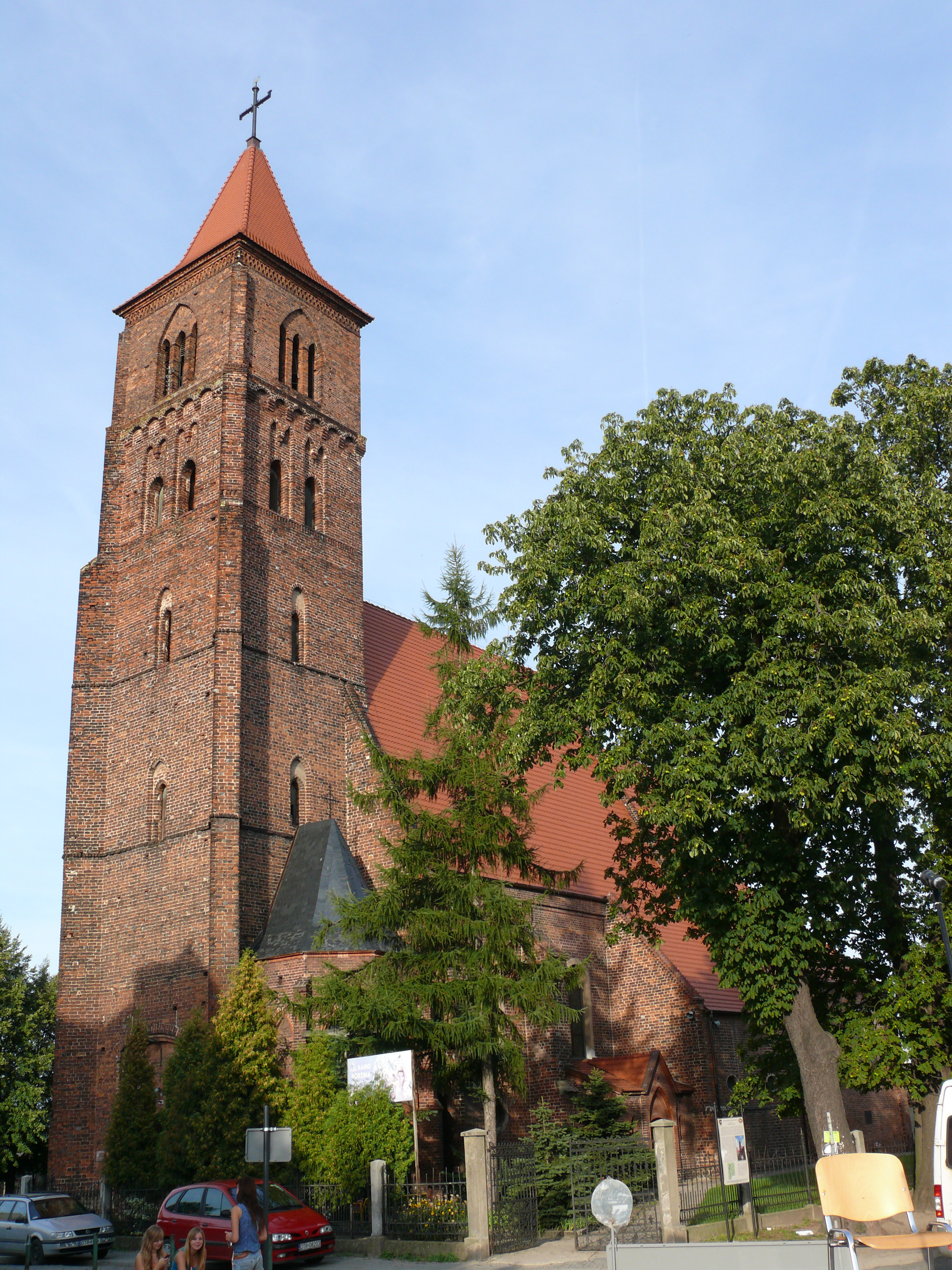
Saint James church

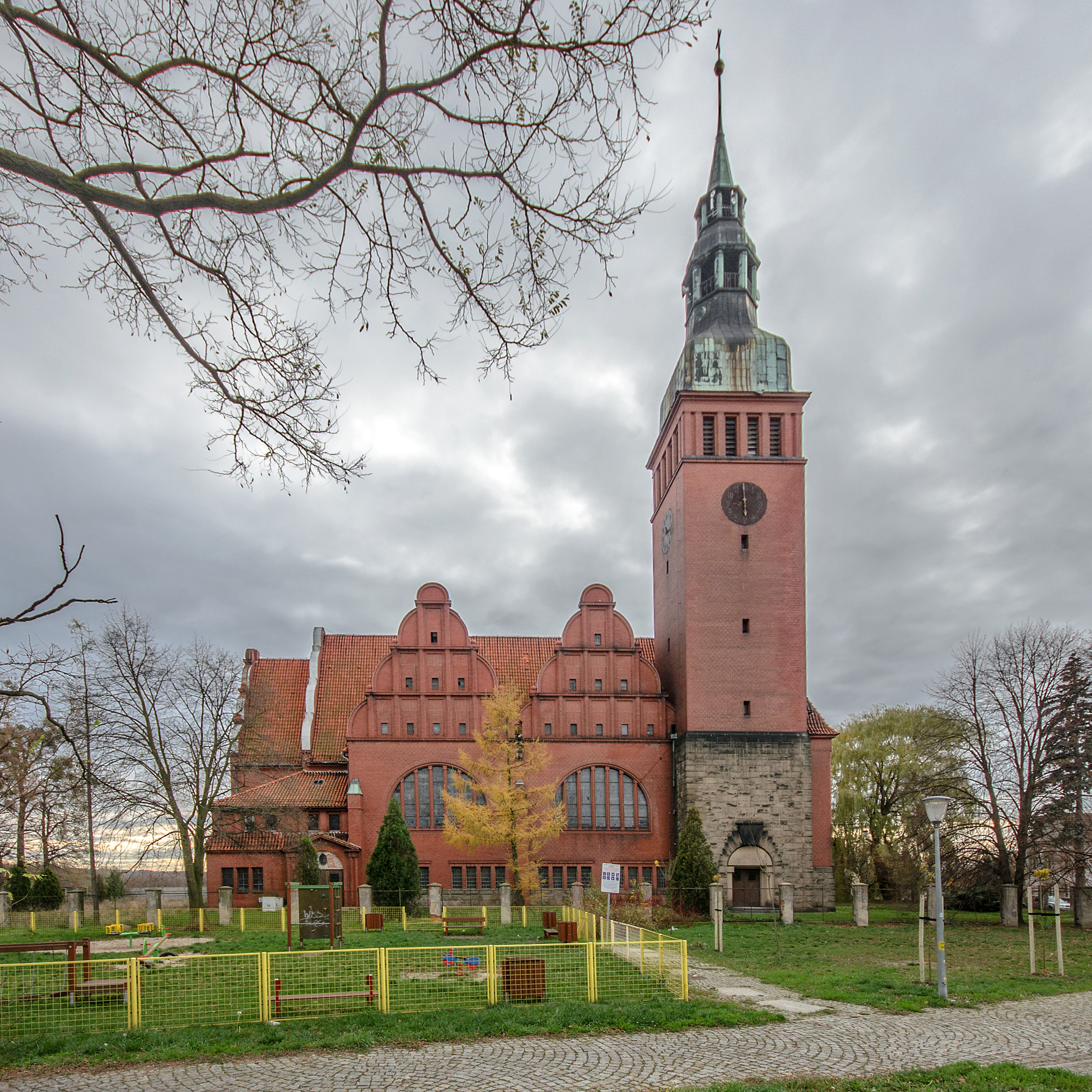
Saint Joseph church

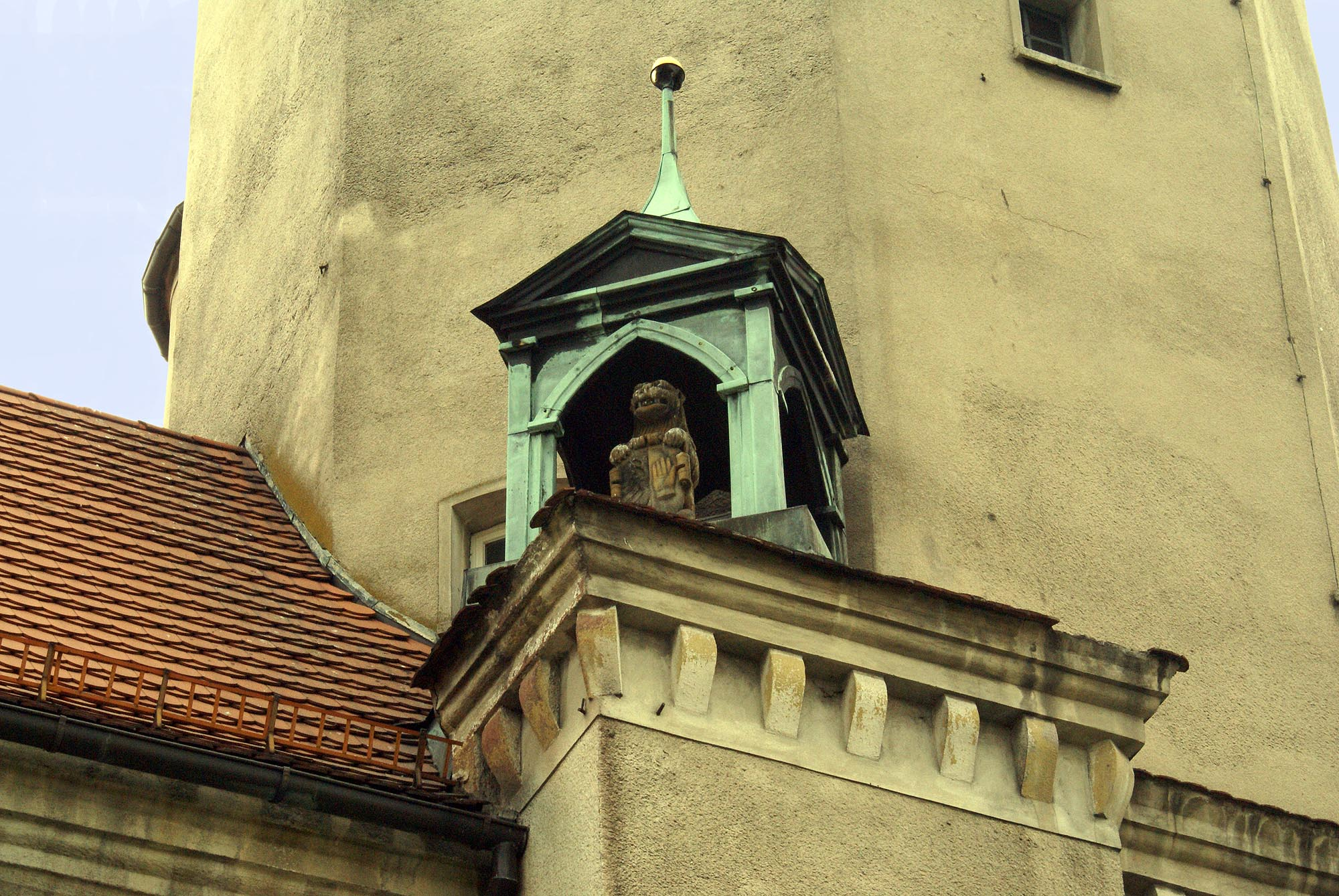
Town Hall

== Transport ==
Prusice is bypassed to the west by the S5 expressway. Exits 55 and 54 of the expressway provide quick access to Poznań and Wrocław.

The nearest railway station is to the west in the village of Skokowa.

== Twin towns – sister cities ==
See twin towns of Gmina Prusice.
