= Wszemirów =

- Village
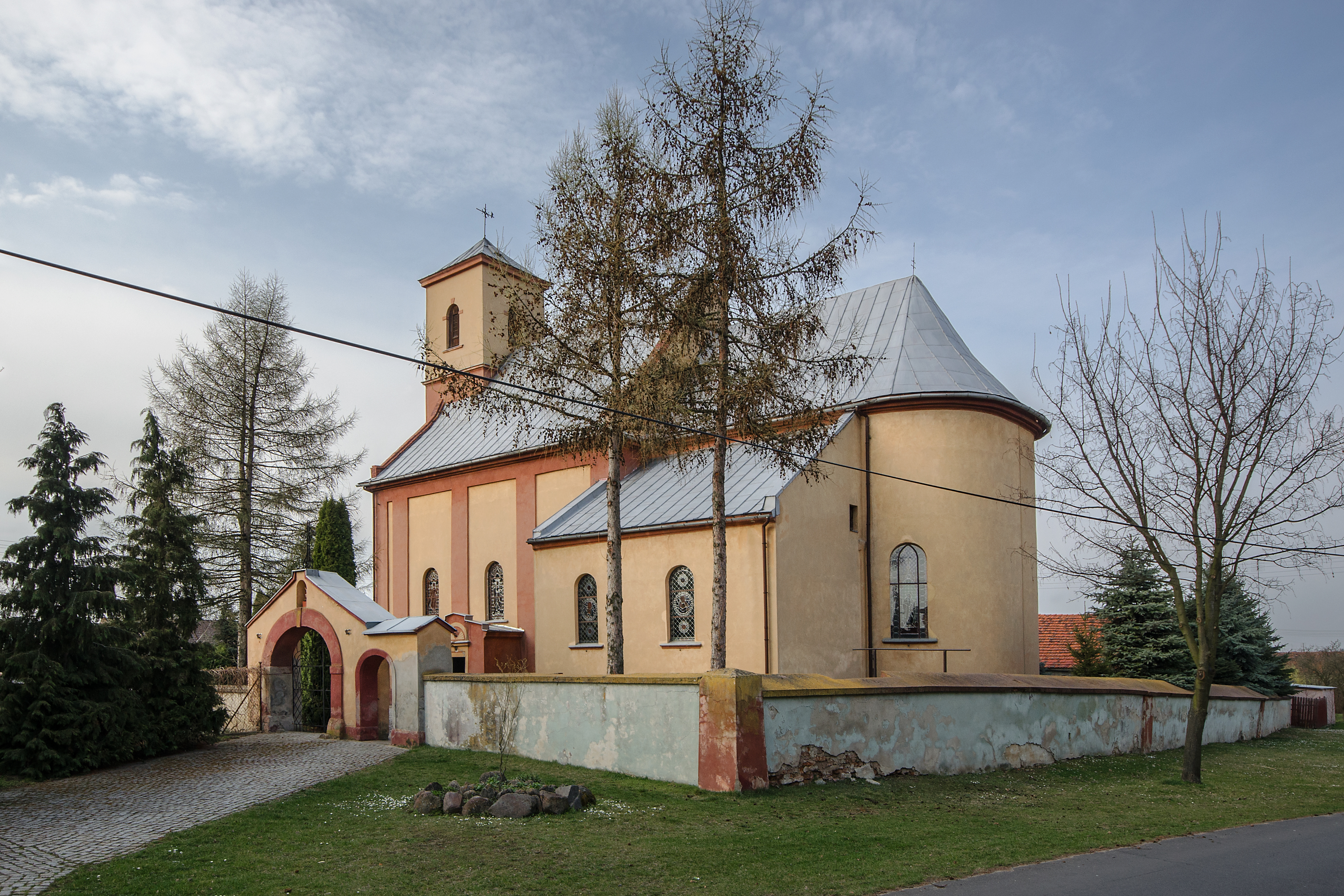
- Catholic church

- Location within Poland
- Coordinates: 51°22′N 17°0′E
- Country: Poland
- Voivodeship: Lower Silesian
- County: Trzebnica
- Gmina: Prusice
- Population: 490

Wszemirów [fʂɛˈmiruf] is a village in the administrative district of Gmina Prusice, within Trzebnica County, Lower Silesian Voivodeship, in south-western Poland.
