= Kopaszyn, Lower Silesian Voivodeship =

Kopaszyn
- Village
- Location within Poland
- Coordinates: 51°20′41″N 16°57′02″E
- Country: Poland
- Voivodeship: Lower Silesian
- County: Trzebnica
- Gmina: Prusice

Kopaszyn [kɔˈpaʂɨn] is a village in the administrative district of Gmina Prusice, within Trzebnica County, Lower Silesian Voivodeship, in south-western Poland.
