= Ligotka, Lower Silesian Voivodeship =

Ligotka
- Village
- Location within Poland
- Coordinates: 51°23′49″N 16°57′52″E
- Country: Poland
- Voivodeship: Lower Silesian
- County: Trzebnica
- Gmina: Prusice
- Population: 85

Ligotka [liˈɡɔtka] is a village of 85 people in the administrative district of Gmina Prusice, within Trzebnica County, Lower Silesian Voivodeship, in south-western Poland.
