= Pawłów Trzebnicki =

- Village
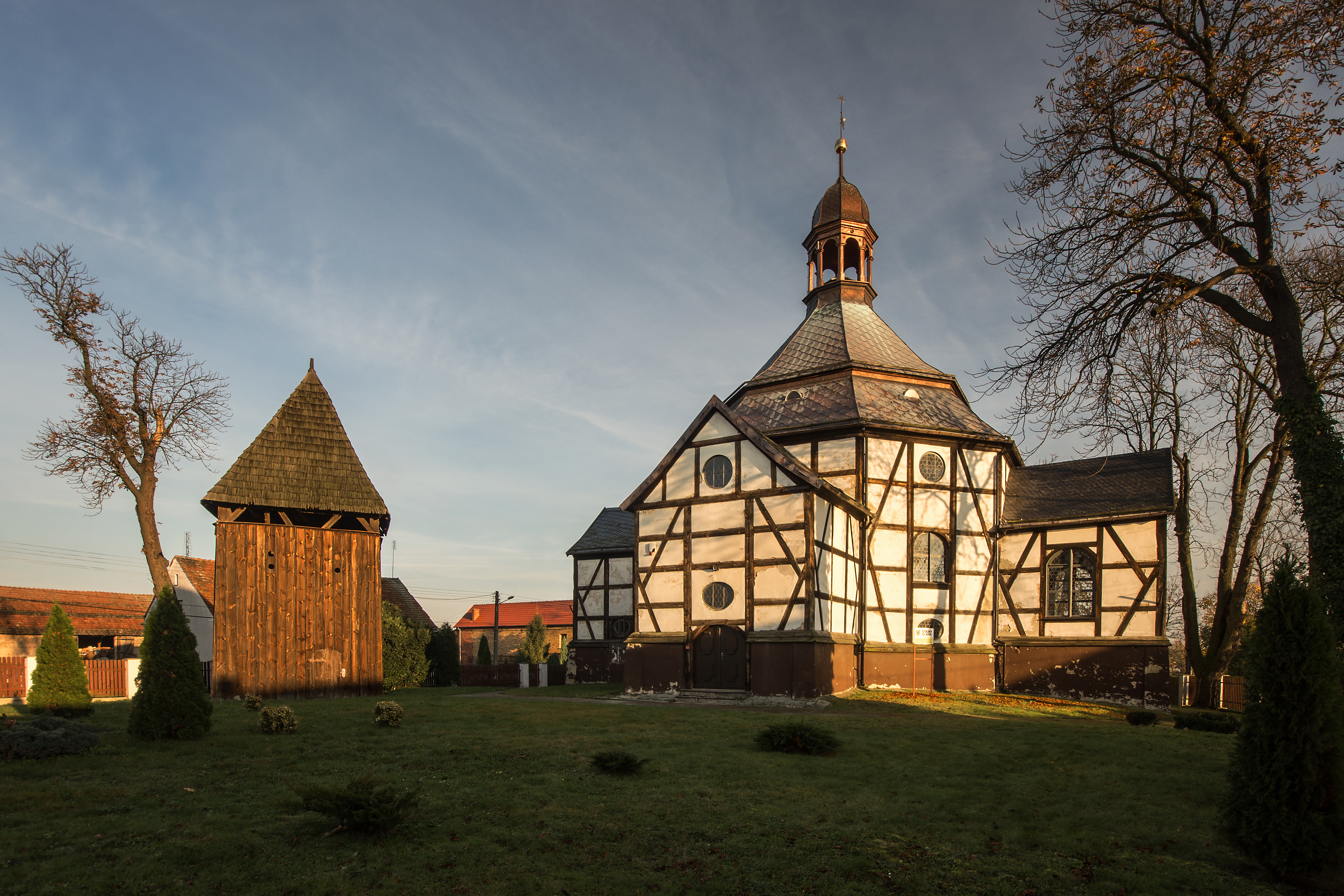
- Saints Peter and Paul church in Pawłów Trzebnicki

- Location within Poland
- Coordinates: 51°21′32″N 17°01′41″E
- Country: Poland
- Voivodeship: Lower Silesian
- County: Trzebnica
- Gmina: Prusice
- Website: http://www.pawlowtrzebnicki.pl

Pawłów Trzebnicki [ˈpavwuf tʂɛbˈnit͡ski] is a village in the administrative district of Gmina Prusice, within Trzebnica County, Lower Silesian Voivodeship, in south-western Poland.
