= Kaszyce Wielkie =

- Village
- Location within Poland
- Coordinates: 51°24′49″N 17°01′22″E
- Country: Poland
- Voivodeship: Lower Silesian
- County: Trzebnica
- Gmina: Prusice

Kaszyce Wielkie [kaˈʂɨt͡sɛ ˈvjɛlkʲɛ] is a village in the administrative district of Gmina Prusice, within Trzebnica County, Lower Silesian Voivodeship, in south-western Poland.
