= Heinrich Lades =

German politician (1914–1990)

Mayor of Erlangen
- In office 1959-1972

Personal details
- Born: July 4, 1914; Nuremberg
- Died: August 4, 1990
- Political party: Christian Social Union

Karl Heinrich Lades (4 July 1914 – 4 August 1990) was a German politician of the Christian Social Union (CSU) and mayor of Erlangen from 1959 to 1972.

== Private and public life ==
Lades was born in Nuremberg, spending his childhood in Erlangen. From 1933 to 1939 he studied jurisprudence and economics in Munich and Erlangen, being sent to the Wehrmacht afterwards. After his return from war, he started his career as a politician in Munich, later moving to Bonn.

== Mayor of Erlangen ==
After the death of his predecessor, Michael Poeschke, Heinrich Lades was elected as mayor of Erlangen on 5 July 1959, defeating his only competitor, Peter Zink, with 57.9% of all votes. Lades was reelected in 1965 with 65.1% and 1971 with 51.9%. As changes in territory raised the necessity for an early mayoral election, Lades eventually lost against his successor Dietmar Hahlweg.
