= Gmina Prusice =

Gmina Prusice Prusice Commune
- Gmina
- Interactive map of Gmina Prusice
- Coordinates (Prusice): 51°22′16″N 16°57′43″E
- Country: Poland
- Voivodeship: Lower Silesian
- County: Trzebnica
- Seat: Prusice
- Sołectwos: Borów, Borówek, Brzeźno, Budzicz, Chodlewko, Dębnica, Gola, Górowo, Jagoszyce, Kaszyce Wielkie, Kopaszyn, Kosinowo, Krościna Mała, Krościna Wielka, Ligota Strupińska, Ligotka, Pawłów Trzebnicki, Pększyn, Pietrowice Małe, Piotrkowice, Raszowice, Skokowa, Strupina, Świerzów, Wilkowa, Wszemirów

Area
  - Total: 158.02 km^{2} (61.01 sq mi)

Population (2019-06-30)
  - Total: 9,374
  - Density: 59.32/km^{2} (153.6/sq mi)
  - Urban: 2,243
  - Rural: 7,131
- Website: http://prusice.pl

Gmina Prusice is an urban-rural gmina (administrative district) in Trzebnica County, Lower Silesian Voivodeship, in south-western Poland. Its seat is the town of Prusice, which lies approximately 11 kilometres (7 mi) north-west of Trzebnica, and 28 kilometres (17 mi) north of the regional capital Wrocław. It is part of the Wrocław metropolitan area.

The gmina covers an area of 158.02 square kilometres (61.0 sq mi). As of 2019, its total population was 9,374.

== Neighbouring gminas ==
Gmina Prusice is bordered by the gminas of Oborniki Śląskie, Trzebnica, Wińsko, Wołów and Żmigród.

== Villages ==
Apart from the town of Prusice, the gmina contains the villages of Borów, Borówek, Brzeźno, Budzicz, Chodlewko, Dębnica, Gola, Górowo, Jagoszyce, Kaszyce Wielkie, Kopaszyn, Kosinowo, Krościna Mała, Krościna Wielka, Ligota Strupińska, Ligotka, Pawłów Trzebnicki, Pększyn, Pietrowice Małe, Piotrkowice, Raszowice, Skokowa, Strupina, Świerzów, Wilkowa and Wszemirów.

== Twin towns – sister cities ==
Gmina Prusice is twinned with:

- Laudenbach, Germany
- Myrnohrad, Ukraine
- Prusice, Czech Republic
