= Borówek, Lower Silesian Voivodeship =

Borówek
- Village
- Location within Poland
- Coordinates: 51°22′44″N 16°51′35″E
- Country: Poland
- Voivodeship: Lower Silesian
- County: Trzebnica
- Gmina: Prusice

Borówek [bɔˈruvɛk] is a village in the administrative district of Gmina Prusice, within Trzebnica County, Lower Silesian Voivodeship, in south-western Poland.
