= Świerzów =

- Village
- Location within Poland
- Coordinates: 51°20′15″N 16°56′23″E
- Country: Poland
- Voivodeship: Lower Silesian
- County: Trzebnica
- Gmina: Prusice

Świerzów (Polish pronunciation: [ˈɕfjɛʐuf]) is a village in the administrative district of Gmina Prusice, within Trzebnica County, Lower Silesian Voivodeship, in south-western Poland.
