= Dietmar Hahlweg =

German politician

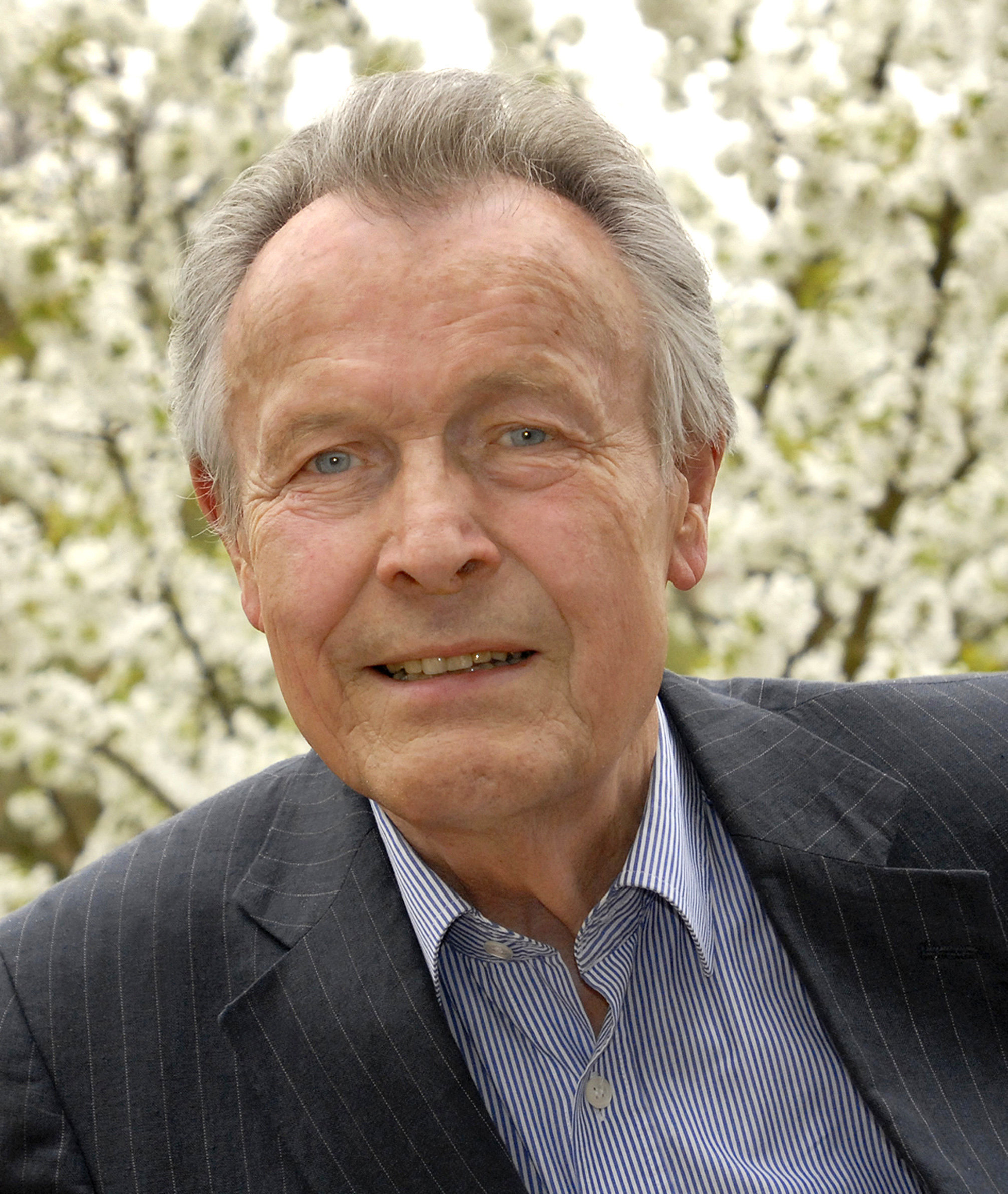
- Hahlweg in 2009

Mayor of Erlangen
- In office 1972–1996

Personal details
- Born: December 31, 1934 (age 91) Jagatschütz, Germany
- Party: SPD
- Education: University of Erlangen–Nuremberg

Dietmar Hahlweg (born 31 December 1934 in Jagatschütz) is a German Politician (SPD). He was Erlangen's mayor from 1972 to 1996.

== Biography ==
Dietmar Hahlweg was born in the Lower Silesian village of Jagatschütz near Prusice modern. After World War II he lived with his family in Upper Franconia. After graduating from high school in 1953, Hahlweg studied law in Bonn, Munich and Erlangen from 1953 to 1957. In 1960, he received his doctorate at the University of Erlangen–Nuremberg. After his second Staatsexamen in 1961–62, he spent time abroad at the University of Pittsburgh.

From 1964 onwards, Hahlweg was a civil servant at the district office in Erlangen. From 1971 to 1972, he headed the office for planning and building supervision at the government of Middle Franconia.

Dietmar Hahlweg is married. The television personality Barbara Hahlweg is his daughter.

== As mayor of Erlangen ==
=== Election results ===
In 1971, Hahlweg was the SPD's first candidate for the office of Lord Mayor of Erlangen, losing out to Heinrich Lades with 48.1% of the votes. In the re-election, which became necessary one year later due to the territorial reform in Bavaria, he clearly won with 56.4% against Lades. At the age of 37, he was the youngest Lord Mayor of Bavaria when he took office.

In the Mayor elections of 1978 (57.9 percent against Gerd Lohwasser (CSU), among others), 1984 (59.4 percent against Gerd Lohwasser among others) and 1990 (57.4 percent against Joachim Herrmann among others) Hahlweg was confirmed in all cases in the first ballot. In the 1996 mayoral election, Hahlweg did not stand for re-election and resigned from office on 30 April 1996. Siegfried Balleis (CSU) was elected as his successor.

=== Environmental policy ===
Dietmar Hahlweg's "conviction of the equivalence of ecology and economy" became a trademark of his politics. This led to an environmentally oriented urban development with environmentally friendly transport policy and landscape and garden planning. Above all, the consistent promotion of utility cycling earned Erlangen the reputation of a bicycle city. But also other measures of Dietmar Hahlweg, such as the modernisation of the sewage treatment plant, the expansion of the district heating and natural gas networks and the direct feeding of solar power into the network of the municipal utilities, led to Erlangen's inclusion in the UN list of honour "Global 500" and to the award of the title "Federal Capital for Nature and Environmental Protection" by the Environmental Action Germany both in 1990 and 1991.

=== Ostpolitik ===
The Social Democrat Hahlweg also endeavoured to support Willy Brandt's Ostpolitik at local level. This included events such as "Encounter with Poland" (1976) or the start of negotiations on a town twinning with Vladimir in the then Soviet Union. The twinning negotiations led to success in 1987, as did the negotiations with Jena.

=== Committee of the Regions ===
Hahlweg was a member of several committees of the German Association of Cities and Towns and its representatives in the European Committee of the Regions.

== Awards ==
Dietmar Hahlweg has received numerous awards over the course of his life. In 1981 he was awarded the Nature Conservation Prize of the German Association for Nature Conservation in Bavaria. He has been a Knight of the French Legion of Honour since 1991 and was awarded the Federal Cross of Merit 1st Class in 1993. Since 1995 he has been awarded the Bavarian Order of Merit. He is also honorary senator of the University of Erlangen–Nuremberg.

Dietmar Hahlweg was awarded the honorary citizenship of Erlangen for his services to the city of Erlangen when he left office in 1996.

In the same year he was awarded the Max & Moritz Prize at the Comic Salon Erlangen as a "special prize" of the jury. "It is thanks to this man, who doesn't even want to be called an explicit comic fan, that the Erlangen Comic Salon could become what it is today: a comic festival with world renown." (Raphael Wünsch, 1996)

Dietmar Hahlweg became nationally known through the Erlangen fun metal band J.B.O., because he is mentioned in their song Der Weiße Hai im Dechsendorfer Weiher.
