= Jana Pareigis =

German journalist and television moderator

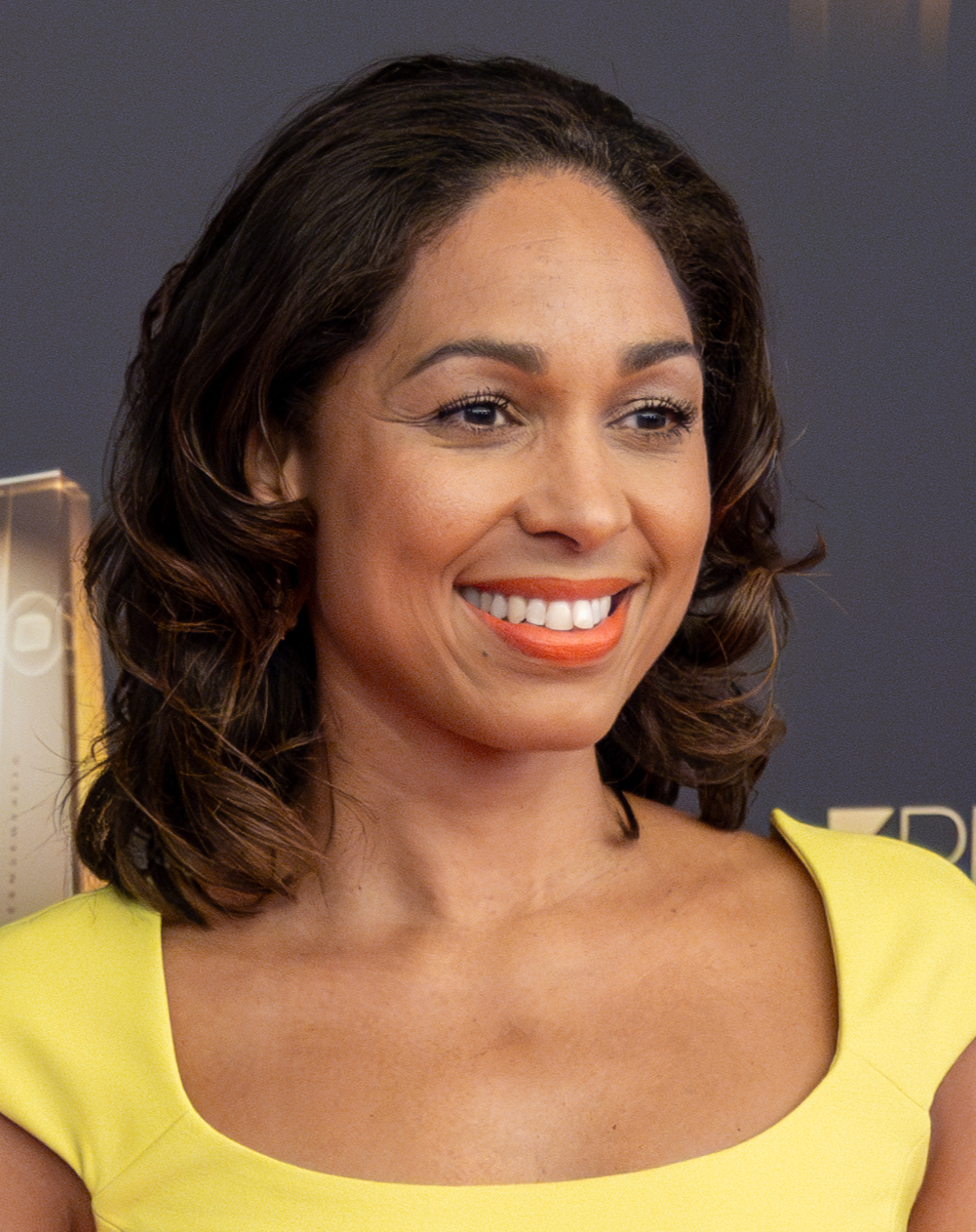
- Pareigis at the Deutscher Fernsehpreis in 2024
- Born: 23 June 1981 (age 44); Hamburg, Germany
- Occupations: Journalist; Television moderator

Jana Pareigis (born 23 June 1981 in Hamburg) is a German journalist and television moderator. She is the first black woman in German news journalism.

== Life and career ==
Pareigis has a polyethnic migration background with relatives in Germany, Sweden and Zimbabwe. She grew up with adoptive parents; her father is from Zimbabwe, and her mother was German.

She studied political science and African studies in her hometown of Hamburg as well as in New York City and Berlin. From 2010, she was a TV presenter for the news program Journal at DW-TV as well as a freelance editor, inter alia for Westdeutscher Rundfunk (WDR), Zeit Online and Deutsche Welle.

Pareigis began her television career as assistant to the editor-in-chief at N24 in Berlin. Before that, she had already gained professional experience in the United Nations Department of Peace Operations, the Reuters news agency and various foundations and newspaper publishers. From December 2014, she moderated ZDF-Morgenmagazin. In 2016, she featured in the DW documentary Afro.Deutschland, which deals with racism against black people in Germany. Since April 2018, she has been the main presenter of ZDF-Mittagsmagazin. On 24 February 2021, she presented the 12 o'clock heute news on Zweites Deutsches Fernsehen (ZDF) for the first time. Since July 27, 2021, she has been presenting the heute-Nachrichten on ZDF at 7 p.m. as Petra Gerster's successor.

Pareigis wrote a foreword in 2019 for the new German translation of James Baldwin's volume of essays The Fire Next Time entitled Nach der Flut das Feuer. In it, she emphasizes Baldwin's importance for understanding the present and reports on her own experiences with racism.

== Personal life ==
Jana Pareigis is the mother of a son and lives in Berlin and Mainz.
