= Strupina =

- Village
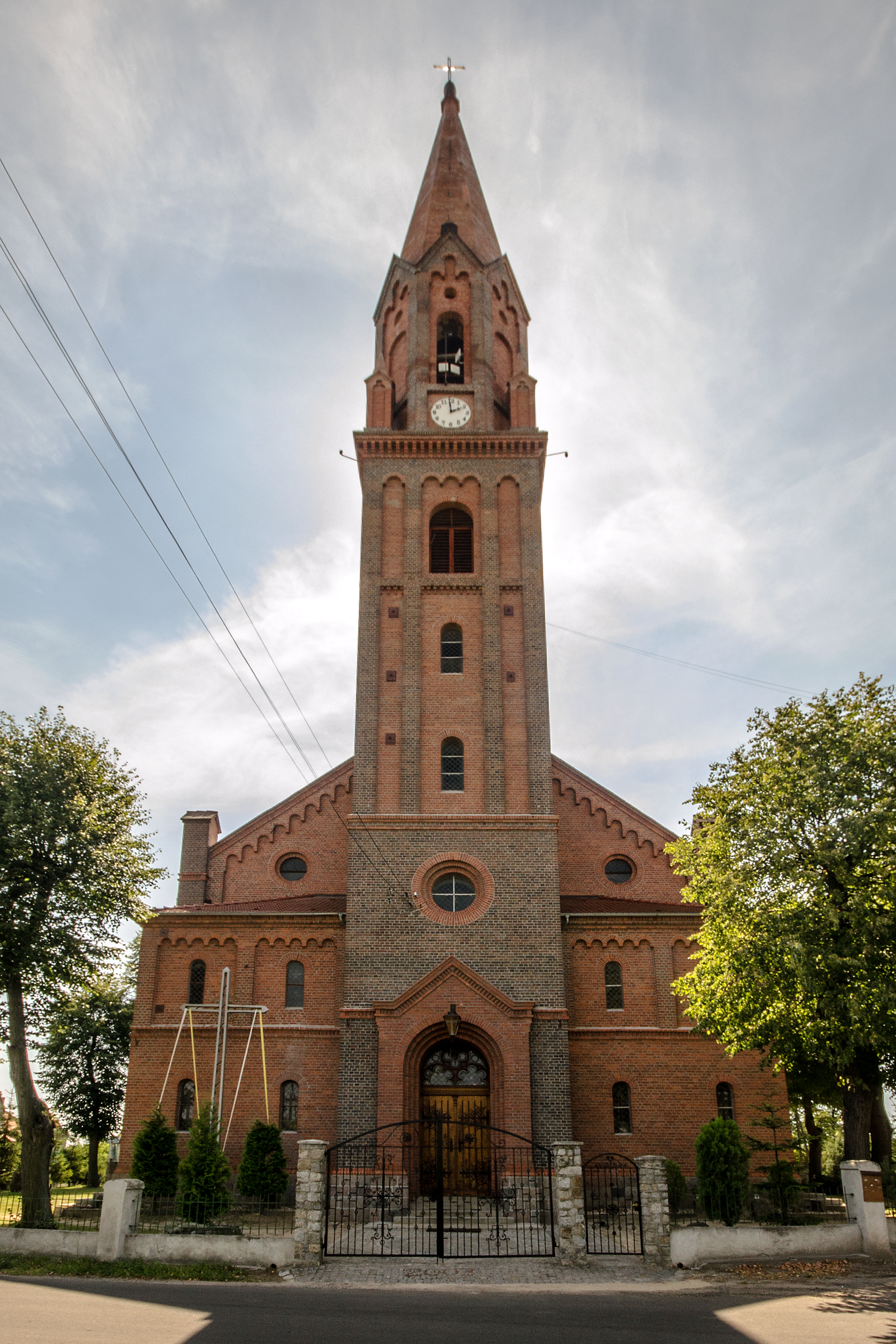
- Immaculate Heart of Mary church in Strupina

- Coat of arms

- Location within Poland
- Coordinates: 51°23′N 16°49′E
- Country: Poland
- Voivodeship: Lower Silesian
- County: Trzebnica
- Gmina: Prusice

Population
  - Total: 450
- Time zone: UTC+1 (CET)
  - Summer (DST): UTC+2 (CEST)
- Vehicle registration: DTR

Strupina [struˈpina] is a village in the administrative district of Gmina Prusice, within Trzebnica County, Lower Silesian Voivodeship, in south-western Poland.

== History ==
It was granted town rights before 1253. In 1253, it was mentioned in documents as Srupin. Weekly markets were established in the mid-13th century. It was captured and ravaged by Swedish troops in 1639–1643, Imperial troops in 1644 and Cossacks in 1759–1762.
