= Skokowa =

- Village
- Location within Poland
- Coordinates: 51°23′N 16°51′E
- Country: Poland
- Voivodeship: Lower Silesian
- County: Trzebnica
- Gmina: Prusice
- Population: 1,000
- Website: http://www.skokowa.pl

Skokowa [skɔˈkɔva] is a village in the administrative district of Gmina Prusice, within Trzebnica County, Lower Silesian Voivodeship, in south-western Poland.
