= Barbara Hahlweg =

German journalist and television presenter

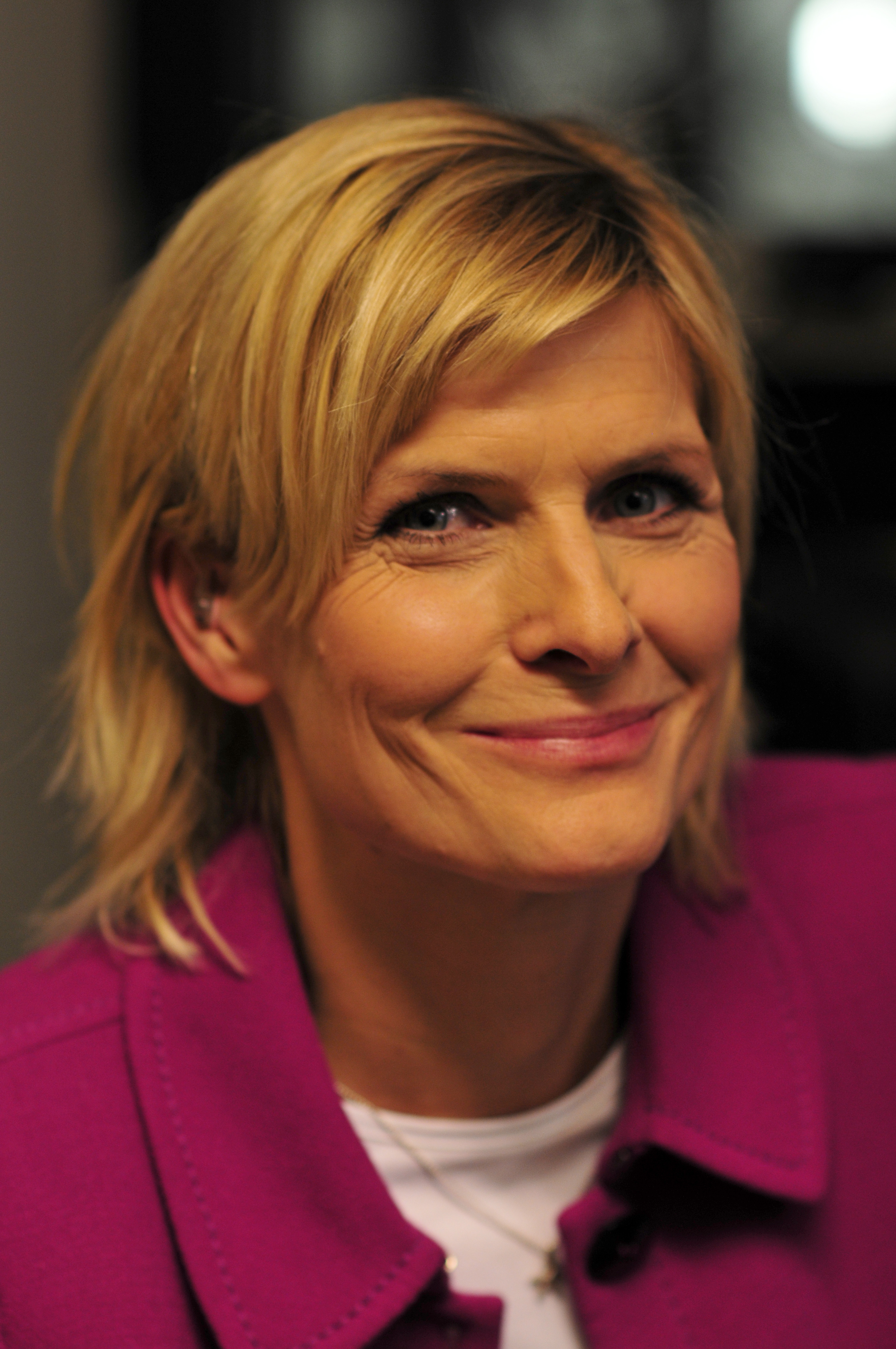
Image of Barbara

Barbara Hahlweg (born November 29, 1968, in Erlangen) is a German journalist and television presenter of the ZDF program heute.

== Life and professional career ==
Barbara Hahlweg is the daughter of the former mayor of Erlangen, Dietmar Hahlweg, and completed her Abitur at Emmy-Noether-Gymnasium Erlangen in 1988. This was followed by a year in the US and finally a master's degree in communication science with the subsidiary subjects economics and market and advertising psychology at the Ludwig-Maximilians-Universität München.

Between 1996 and 1997, Hahlweg completed a traineeship at ZDF. She then became a studio editor for heute from 1998 and presented heute mittag and the afternoon editions until 2003. She also worked as a reporter on hallo deutschland and as a presenter on TOP 7 and until 2003 on Leute heute.

From 2003 to 2007, Hahlweg took over as co-presenter on heute-journal alongside Klaus-Peter Siegloch. Since 2007, Barbara Hahlweg has been the presenter of the 7 p.m. today news on ZDF

From May 2011 Hahlweg was also the main presenter of the ZDF magazine ML Mona Lisa, which she presented until it was discontinued in July 2017. In addition the content of the program was realigned with her.

In addition to her work as a presenter, Barbara Hahlweg occasionally shoots documentaries for ZDF. In 2016, she produced Alles im Fluss – Leben auf dem Hausboot, a year later Vom Glück auf zwei Rädern and in 2018 the documentary Vereint und doch nicht eins?, for which she traveled around eastern Germany.

== Other ==
She is married to Peter Arens, head of the ZDF main editorial department for history and science, and has three daughters.

Since 2014 Barbara Hahlweg has been a member of the advisory board for the Heraeus Education Foundation and is patron of the Ronald McDonald House in Erlangen. Since 2017, she has been an honorary member of the association Tangeni Shilongo Namibia e. V.

Through her husband Peter Arens, Barbara Hahlweg met the writer John Irving, about whom Arens had made a TV documentary in 1999, which was broadcast on the TV channel Arte in 2000. John Irving included Hahlweg in his 2001 novel The Fourth Hand as a character under the name Barbara Frei.
