= Michael Poeschke =

German community politician, former mayor of Erlangen (1901–1959)

Michael Georg Poeschke (6 March 1901 in Erlangen - 10 May 1959 in Langenzenn) was a German politician (SPD) and mayor of Erlangen from 1946 to 1959.

== Life before 1933 ==
Michael Poeschke was born as the ninth child of a tailor in 1901. In 1915, he started his apprenticeship as drafter. The same year he joined the sozialistische Arbeiterjugend, a socialist youth organisation. He was the head of Erlangen's subgroup from 1919 to 1923. In 1919 Poeschke joined the SPD. After he became editor of the Erlanger Volksblatt in 1923, he was elected the first chairman of Erlangen's SPD one year later.

== Whilst Nazism ==
Poeschke was arrested in March 1933 and later moved to the Dachau concentration camp. In April he was released due to the inauguration of the Bavarian Landtag, which he became member of after its recreation. Shortly after, Poeschke had to go to hospital because of his injuries resulting of his detention.

After being arrested again on 30 June 1933, he was released on 20 June 1934. Afterwards, Poeschke moved to Upper Silesia. In 1939, he was conscripted by the Wehrmacht.

== After World War II ==
On 6 August 1945, Poeschke was elected 2. mayor of Erlangen. One year later, on 4 September 1946, he became Erlangen's mayor and thus the successor of Anton Hammerbacher. He was reelected in 1948 as well as 1952 (with 92.4% of all votes) and in 1958 (57.8%).

== Literature ==
- Walter Schweigert, Klaus Treuheit (Hrsg.): „… daß der Mensch dem Menschen ein Helfer ist“. 120 Jahre Sozialdemokratie in Erlangen; Erlangen 1990.
- H. Hedayati: Berühmte Persönlichkeiten geboren in Erlangen. Stichwort Poeschke, Michael Georg;
