= List of cities and towns in Poland =

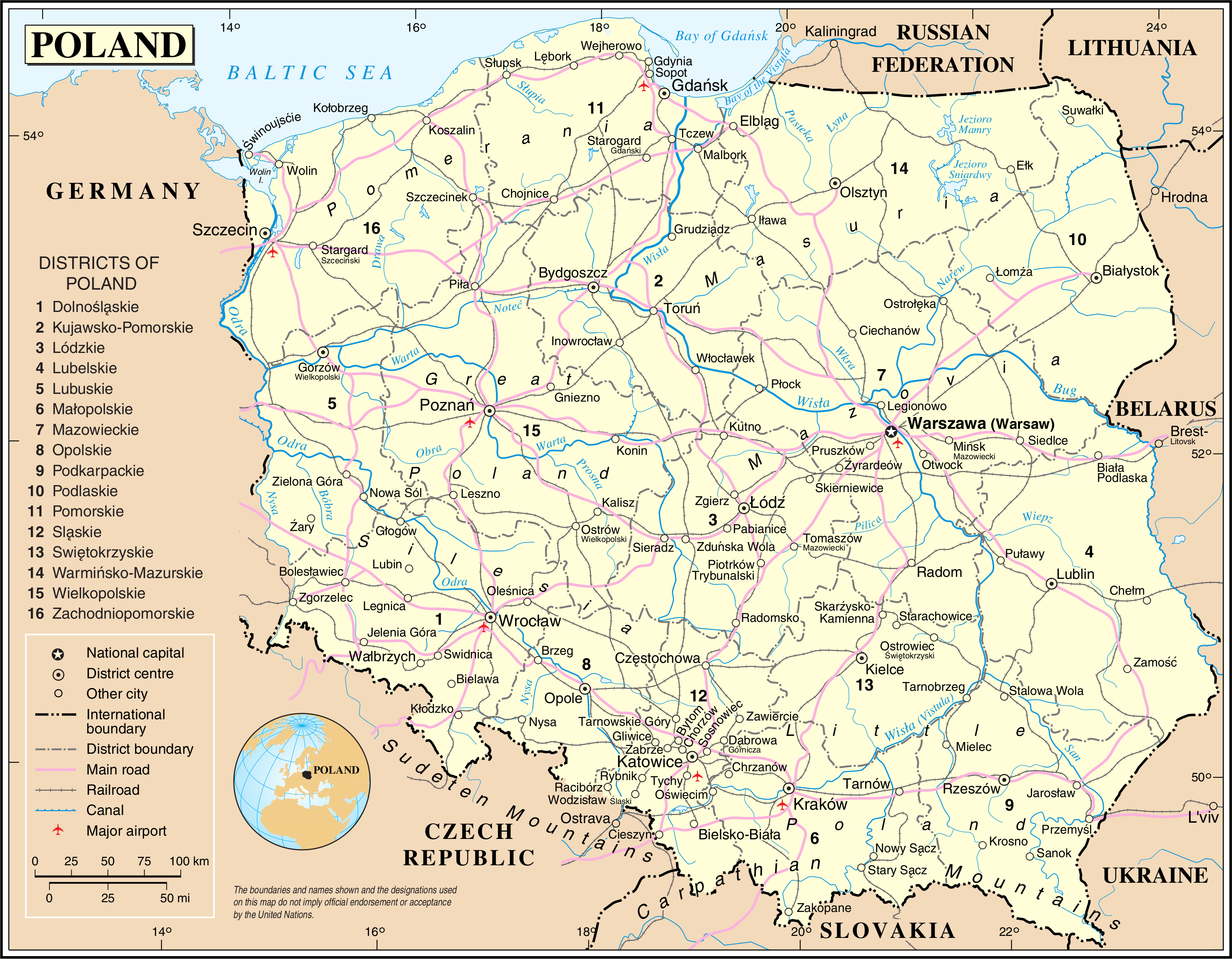
Map of Poland

This is a list of cities and towns in Poland, consisting of five sections: an introduction, the full list of all 107 cities in Poland by size, followed by a description of the principal metropolitan areas of the country, the table of the most populated cities and towns in Poland, and finally, the full alphabetical list of all 107 Polish cities and 919 towns combined.

== Introduction ==
As of 1 January 2026, there are altogether 2479 municipalities (gmina) in Poland:

- 1453 of them are rural gminas containing exclusively rural areas, each of them forms a part of one of the 314 regular powiats, but never as its seat,
- the remaining 1026 contain a locality classified either as a city or a town, among them:
  - 724 towns are managed together with their rural surroundings under a single local government in the form of an eponymous urban-rural gmina typically seated in such town (though not always; currently, Gmina Nowe Skalmierzyce is the only urban-rural gmina seated elsewhere than in the town); such mixed municipalities always form part of a regular powiat, sometimes seated in such town, in such case being usually an eponymous one (though there are some exceptions; e.g. Warsaw West County is seated in the town Ożarów Mazowiecki while Gdańsk County is seated in the town Pruszcz Gdański, although their names would suggest otherwise; in addition, two binominal "hyphen" counties seated in such towns have been named so due to long-established animosity between a pair of towns similar in size, in order to placate both competing populations, namely Strzelce-Drezdenko County and Ropczyce-Sędziszów County; finally, the mountainuous Bieszczady County has been named after the mountain range rather than its seat)
  - 302 cities and towns are standalone as an urban gmina; nevertheless some of them be also a seat of an eponymous rural gmina surrounding it (the latter thus being often doughnut-shaped), despite not being a part of its territory;
    - 195 standalone towns, each of them forming a part of a regular powiat and sometimes being its seat, in the latter case usually an eponymous one, though there are three exceptions (two of them are binominal "hyphen" counties, with Czarnków-Trzcianka County named so due to a long-established animosity between a pair of towns similar in size, while Bieruń-Lędziny County acquired its name when the decision was taken to have its seat relocated from its original location in Tychy, a city with powiat rights, to one of these two competing towns; the third exception is the mountainuous Tatra County named after the mountain range rather than its seat)
    - 107 cities (governed by a city mayor or prezydent miasta), among them:
      - 41 cities form along with two or more other municipalities an eponymous regular powiat, seated always in the city
      - 66 cities hold status of a city with powiat rights (an independent city) which is an urban gmina operating also as a powiat in its own right within a voivodeship; nevertheless, it may be also a seat of a regular powiat, in such case usually an eponymous one (with two exceptions, namely the Łódź East County bearing the additional designation East because of bordering the city only to the west, as well as the mountainuous Karkonosze County seated in Jelenia Góra but named after the mountain range rather than its seat) despite not being included in the territory of the county (the latter thus being often doughnut-shaped)
        - 34 cities are over 100,000, including
          - 18 cities which serve as a seat for voivode or the voivodeship sejmik, thus being informally called voivodeship cities or capitals (in spite of only 16 voivodeships existing in Poland; the discrepancy is caused by the fact that both institutions are seated in a single capital city in only 14 of the 16 voivodeships, while in each of the remaining two they are divided equally between a pair of capital cities),
            - 11 of them are seats of an appeal court and other supra-voivodeship institutions,
              - They include the capital city of the country, the only Polish city with population exceeding 1,000,000, and the only one governed by a dedicated act of Parliament.

In some cases, a city with powiat rights may also be a seat of both an eponymous rural gmina and an eponymous regular powiat, despite belonging to neither, e.g. Siedlce, Skierniewice, Słupsk. No city in Poland constitutes a separate voivodeship in its own right, though 5 cities held such status in the past.

== General principles ==
Municipalities in Poland are governed regardless of their type under the mandatory mayor–council government system. Executive power in a rural gmina is exercised by a wójt, while the homologue in municipalities containing cities or towns is called accordingly either a city mayor (prezydent miasta) or a town mayor (burmistrz), all of them elected by a two-round direct election, while the town/city council is the legislative, budget-making and oversight body. Any local laws considered non-compliant with the national ones may be invalidated by the respective voivode, whose rulings may be appealed to an administrative court. Decisions in individual cases may in turn be appealed to quasi-judicial bodies named local government boards of appeal, their ruling subject to appeal to an administrative court. A town or city mayor may be scrutinized or denied funding for his/her projects by the council, but is not politically responsible to it and does not require its confidence to remain in office; therefore, cohabitation is not uncommon. A recall referendum may however be triggered either in respect to the wójt/town mayor/city mayor or to the municipal council through a petition supported by at least 1/10 of eligible voters, but the turnout in the recall referendum must be at least 3/5 of the number of people voting in the original election in order for the referendum to be valid and binding. In addition, elected bodies of any municipality may be suspended by the Prime Minister of Poland in case of persisting law transgressions or negligence, resulting in such case in the municipality being placed under receivership. In a city with powiat rights, the city mayor additionally has the powers and duties of a powiat executive board and a starosta, while the city council has the powers and duties of a powiat (county) council; both nevertheless being elected under the municipal election rules rather than those applicable to county elections.

== Cities ==
Location of cities in Poland with a population above: 1,000,000 (orange: Warsaw), 750,000 (yellow: Kraków), 500,000 (green: Wrocław, Łódź, Poznań), 250,000 (cyan: Gdańsk, Szczecin, Lublin, Bydgoszcz, Białystok, Katowice), 175,000 (blue: Gdynia, Częstochowa, Rzeszów, Toruń, Radom, Sosnowiec, Kielce), 100,000 (purple: Gliwice, Olsztyn, Bielsko-Biała, Zabrze, Bytom, Zielona Góra, Rybnik, Ruda Śląska, Opole, Tychy, Gorzów Wielkopolski, Dąbrowa Górnicza, Elbląg, Płock, Koszalin, Tarnów), 75,000 (white: Chorzów, Włocławek, Wałbrzych, Kalisz, Legnica, Grudziądz, Jaworzno, Słupsk, Jastrzębie-Zdrój, Nowy Sącz).

In spite of no linguistic distinction between a city and a town in the Polish language (both translated miasto), a city may be recognized among other Polish urban municipalities through being managed by a city mayor (prezydent miasta, literally translated city president) instead of a town mayor (burmistrz) as the head of the city executive, thus being informally called miasto prezydenckie, with such privilege automatically awarded to municipalities either inhabited by more than 100,000 residents (currently 34) or those enjoying the status of a city with powiat rights (currently 66). As of 2026, all of the former group fit into the latter, though it was not always the case in the past. There is, however, a number of exemptions due to historic or political reasons, when a municipality meets neither of these two conditions but nevertheless has the city status, including the only 3 capitals of the former voivodeships of Poland (1975–1998) not meeting the abovementioned criteria, as well as 38 other municipalities which do not fit into any of the mentioned categories but have nevertheless been allowed to keep the earlier awarded status due to unspecified historical reasons. Among the 34 cities over 100,000, 18 are seats of voivode or voivodeship sejmik, thus carrying the informal designation of a voivodeship city. 11 of them are seats of an appeal court and other supra-voivodeship institutions.

The 83 Polish cities with a population above 50,000 belong to the following size ranges in terms of the number of inhabitants (cities with powiat rights are indicated with italics; the seats of either a voivode or a voivodeship legislature are marked in bold, the seats of an appeal court are marked with an asterisk*):

- 1 city larger than 1,000,000: **Warsaw***
- 1 city from 750,000 to 1,000,000: **Kraków***
- 3 cities from 500,000 to 750,000: **Wrocław***, **Łódź***, **Poznań***
- 6 cities from 250,000 to 500,000: **Gdańsk***, **Szczecin***, **Lublin***, **Bydgoszcz**, **Białystok***, **Katowice***
- 7 cities from 175,000 to 250,000: Gdynia, Częstochowa, **Rzeszów***, **Toruń**, Radom, Sosnowiec, **Kielce**
- 16 cities from 100,000 to 175,000: Gliwice, **Olsztyn**, Bielsko-Biała, Zabrze, Bytom, **Zielona Góra**, Rybnik, Ruda Śląska, **Opole**, Tychy, **Gorzów Wielkopolski**, Dąbrowa Górnicza, Elbląg, Płock, Koszalin, Tarnów
- 10 cities from 75,000 to 100,000: Chorzów, Włocławek, Wałbrzych, Kalisz, Legnica, Grudziądz, Jaworzno, Słupsk, Jastrzębie-Zdrój, Nowy Sącz
- 12 cities from 62,500 to 75,000: Siedlce, Jelenia Góra, Mysłowice, Piła, Ostrów Wielkopolski, Suwałki, Lubin, Pruszków, Inowrocław, Stargard, Piotrków Trybunalski, Konin
- 27 cities from 50,000 to 62,500: Siemianowice Śląskie, Gniezno, Żory, Tarnowskie Góry, Głogów, Ostrowiec Świętokrzyski, Pabianice, Łomża, Ełk, Leszno, Zamość, Tomaszów Mazowiecki, Mielec, Tczew, Chełm, Przemyśl, Rumia, Stalowa Wola, Biała Podlaska, Kędzierzyn-Koźle, Będzin, Zgierz, Legionowo, Piaseczno, Świdnica, Piekary Śląskie, Bełchatów

Seven cities with powiat rights have a population of less than 50,000: Ostrołęka, Skierniewice, Świętochłowice, Krosno, Tarnobrzeg, Świnoujście, Sopot.

== Principal metropolitan areas ==
Only a single officially incorporated multi-purpose metropolitan union exists in Poland, the sui generis Metropolis GZM, established by a dedicated act of Parliament of Poland within the Silesian Voivodeship, currently composed of 41 contiguous municipalities, with some of them containing also rural areas. Its total population is 2,279,560. The metropolis largely coincides with the metropolitan area of the Katowice urban area, which is a part of the wider polycentric transnational Katowice-Ostrava metropolitan area.

A de facto metropolitan area is, however, also formed in some aspects by Warsaw metropolitan area, consisting of the capital city of Warsaw, a city with powiat rights, and the 9 neighbouring counties: Warsaw West County, Nowy Dwór County, Legionowo County, Wołomin County, Mińsk County, Otwock County, Piaseczno County, Pruszków County and Grodzisk County. Warsaw forms together with these counties a NUTS 2 area separate as an exception from the remainder of its home region, the Mazovian Voivodeship. In addition, identical area is policed by the Capital City Police Headquarters separate from the Mazovian Voivodeship Police Headquarters, with a status equal to that of voivodeship police headquarters. Attempts to establish a formally incorporated metropolitan union have been fiercely resisted by the citizens and the city mayor of Warsaw who have considered them a form of concealed gerrymandering, potentially leading to a political takeover of the city government through aiming to counterbalance the profoundly liberal city population with the conservative population of the neighbouring areas.

A third widely known metropolitan area is the metropolitan area of Tricity in Pomeranian Voivodeship, urban area of which consists of the eponymous cities of Gdańsk, Sopot and Gdynia. The designation has been used informally or semi-formally only. A strategic cooperation declaration, the Tricity Charter (Polish: Karta Trójmiasta), was signed by the three city mayors on 28 March 2007. The only incorporated common management authority in the Tricity metro is the Gdańsk Bay Public Transport Metropolitan Union (Polish: Metropolitarny Związek Komunikacyjny Zatoki Gdańskiej) which is, despite the name, an inter-municipal union and not a metropolitan one.

== Largest cities and towns by population ==
Below is the table of the most populated cities and towns in Poland. The table ranks cities by population based on data from the Central Statistical Office of Poland.

Population at various dates
Name	Voivodeship	30 Jun 2024	1 Jan 2021	30 June 2020	Dec. 2007	1999	1970	1960	1950	1900	Change 2007 – 2020
Warsaw	Masovian	1,862,402	1,794,166	1,793,579	1,706,624	1,618,468	1,315,648	1,139,189	822,036	756,400	4.92%
Kraków	Lesser Poland	807,644	779,966	780,981	766,583	740,666	583,444	481,296	343,638	120,300	1.63%
Wrocław	Lower Silesian	673,531	641,928	643,782	632,930	643,877	526,000	430,522	308,925	422,700	1.60%
Łódź	Łódź	648,711	672,185	677,286	753,192	806,728	762,699	709,698	620,273	351,600	-9.82%
Poznań	Greater Poland	536,818	532,048	533,830	567,932	578,235	471,900	408,132	320,670	126,000	-5.83%
Gdańsk (part of Tricity urban area)	Pomeranian	487,834	470,621	471,525	458,717	458,988	365,600	286,940	194,633	140,600	2.66%
Szczecin	West Pomeranian	387,700	395,513	400,990	410,811	416,988	338,000	269,318	178,907	210,700	-2.17%
Lublin	Lublin	328,868	336,339	339,547	351,806	356,251	238,500	181,304	116,629	53,600	-3.42%
Bydgoszcz	Kuyavian-Pomeranian	324,984	339,053	346,739	361,222	386,855	282,200	232,007	162,524	52,200	-3.61%
Białystok	Podlaskie	290,907	295,683	297,585	294,143	285,000	168,500	120,921	68,503	66,000	1.16%
Katowice (part of Katowice urban area)	Silesian	286,960	291,774	317,220	345,934		305,000	269,926	175,496	31,700	-7.71%
Gdynia (part of Tricity urban area)	Pomeranian	243,918	245,867	250,242	253,521		191,500	147,625	103,458	900	-1.56%
Częstochowa	Silesian	214,342	219,278	242,300	257,812		188,189	164,906	112,198	53,700	-9.02%
Radom	Masovian	206,946	210,532	224,857	232,262		159,480	130,116	80,298	30,100	-6.00%
Rzeszów	Podkarpackie	198,609	196,821	166,454	162,049		83,105	62,526	28,133	18,300	17.88%
Toruń	Kuyavian-Pomeranian	196,935	201,106	206,619	211,955		129,872	104,906	80,637	29,600	-2.50%
Sosnowiec (part of Katowice urban area)	Silesian	194,818	198,996	222,586	244,102		145,000	131,654	96,448	86,700	-10.16%
Kielce	Świętokrzyskie	191,448	194,218	205,902	212,383		126,950	89,500	61,332	23,200	-5.37%
Gliwice (part of Katowice urban area)	Silesian	175,102	178,186	197,393	212,164		172,000	135,300	119,968	52,400	-9.52%
Olsztyn	Warmian-Masurian	169,793	171,853	175,710	171,131		94,753	67,887	43,831	24,300	-2.12%
Zabrze (part of Katowice urban area)	Silesian	168,946	171,691	189,062	200,177		197,840	190,049	172,355	26,000	-8.82%
Bielsko-Biała	Silesian	168,319	170,303	175,690	178,963		106,200	75,527		17,400	-2.86%
Bytom (part of Katowice urban area)	Silesian	161,139	164,447	184,765	205,560		187,500	182,578	173,955	51,400	-10.56%
Zielona Góra	Lubusz	140,403	141,280	117,523	118,182		73,485	54,291	31,634	21,000	20.17%
Rybnik	Silesian	135,994	137,782	141,080	144,582		43,700	34,099	27,222	7,200	-2.11%
Ruda Śląska (part of Katowice urban area)	Silesian	135,008	137,030	144,584	159,665		143,122	131,667	33,962	14,800	-4.99%
Elbląg	Warmian-Masurian	127,390	119,097	126,710	129,782	127,077	128,012	126,748	129,553	52,500	-2.68%
Opole	Opole	126,458	126,775	127,540	126,748	130,969	86,900	63,500	38,464	30,115	1.01%
Tychy (part of Katowice urban area)	Silesian	125,781	127,307	129,776	133,178		71,500	49,914		4,900	-1.68%
Gorzów Wielkopolski	Lubusz	120,087	123,341	125,411	126,019		74,782	58,671	32,825	33,600	-1.43%
Dąbrowa Górnicza (part of Katowice urban area)	Silesian	116,971	118,899	128,795	131,037		61,700	55,720	32,446	3,000	-7.32%
Płock	Masovian	116,962	118,989	126,968	131,011		71,900	42,798	33,128	27,000	-5.94%
Wałbrzych	Lower Silesian	108,222	110,603	123,635	136,923		125,200	117,209	93,842	16,400	-9.93%
Włocławek	Kuyavian-Pomeranian	106,928	109,347	118,432	123,373		82,599	66,820	54,536	23,000	-7.22%
Tarnów	Lesser Poland	105,922	108,177	116,118	118,297		85,929	70,835	37,405	31,700	-6.58%
Chorzów (part of Katowice urban area)	Silesian	105,628	107,443	113,678	121,708		151,946	147,037	129,456	57,900	-5.16%
Koszalin	West Pomeranian	104,994	106,880	107,376	109,941		65,200	44,410	18,940	20,400	-0.31%
Kalisz	Greater Poland	97,905	99,761	108,031	106,641		81,454	69,946	55,542	22,000	-7.21%
Legnica	Lower Silesian	97,300	99,072	104,754	109,335		76,000	64,185	39,010	54,900	-5.16%
Grudziądz	Kuyavian-Pomeranian	92,552	94,076	99,090	102,434		75,668	64,965	45,327	32,700	-4.77%
Jaworzno (part of Katowice urban area)	Silesian	89,350	90,759	96,600	99,800		63,600	53,089	20,229	17,500	-5.67%
Słupsk	Pomeranian	88,835	90,320	97,419	102,370		68,939	53,383	33,115	27,300	-6.92%
Jastrzębie-Zdrój	Silesian	86,632	88,425	93,939	102,294		24,500			1,700	-5.53%
Nowy Sącz	Lesser Poland	83,116	83,762	84,468	83,911		41,300	34,179	26,216		-0.95%
Jelenia Góra	Lower Silesian	77,366	78,778	86,220	93,407		55,900	49,617	34,996		-17.1%
Siedlce	Masovian	77,354	78,258	76,939	76,056		39,280	32,587	25,322		1.7%
Mysłowice (part of Katowice urban area)	Silesian	74,085	74,601	74,912	76,231		44,700	40,228	35,720		-2.88%
Konin	Greater Poland	71,427	73,176	80,140	83,462		40,794	17,638	12,145		-14.5%
Piła	Greater Poland	71,846	72,949	74,687	79,568		43,992	33,785	21,085	18,405	-9.80%
Piotrków Trybunalski	Łódź	71,252	72,785	78,475	81,433		59,843	52,782	42,289		-12.5%
Lubin	Lower Silesian	70,815	72,142	76,306	82,711		28,900	5,471	2,743		-14.4%
Inowrocław	Kuyavian-Pomeranian	70,713	72,561	75,681	79,517		54,911	47,267	38,005		-11.1%
Ostrów Wielkopolski	Greater Poland	70,982	71,829	72,360	74,635		49,705	42,579	32,787	11,800	-4.10%
Suwałki	Podlaskie	69,206	70,126	69,786	69,281	68,815	25,572	19,868	15,456	11,000	0%
Stargard	West Pomeranian	67,293	67,753	70,217	74,166		44,640	33,650	20,684		
Gniezno	Greater Poland	66,769	67,968	69,732	71,460		50,926	44,080	36,039		
Ostrowiec Świętokrzyski	Świętokrzyskie	66,258	67,975	73,111	79,047		50,147	38,108	20,273		
Siemianowice Śląskie (part of Katowice urban area)	Silesian	65,684	66,587	71,621	75,218		67,401	62,411	52,994		
Głogów	Lower Silesian	65,400	66,627	68,297	74,294		20,558	9,179	3,825		
Pabianice	Łódź	63,023	64,445	69,842	74,689		62,402	56,222	48,817		
Leszno	Greater Poland	62,200	63,323	64,057	62,597		33,985	29,157	22,572		
Żory	Silesian	62,848	62,670	62,008	63,683		8,700	6,795	5,037		
Zamość	Lublin	62,021	63,223	66,375	67,099		35,114	27,638	21,558	11,300	
Pruszków	Masovian	62,750	62,489	55,621	53,295		43,366	38,016	27,583		
Łomża	Podlaskie	62,019	62,795	63,036	64,915		25,800	19,876	14,839		
Ełk	Warmian-Masurian	61,677	62,125	56,698	56,464		27,400	21,952	13,665		
Tarnowskie Góry	Silesian	61,842	61,756	60,975	63,126		34,400	28,612	23,115		
Tomaszów Mazowiecki	Łódź	60,529	61,645	66,232	69,389		55,011	48,546	39,391		
Chełm	Lublin	60,231	61,588	67,782	70,759		39,135	31,108	20,550		
Mielec	Podkarpackie	59,509	60,229	61,005	64,455		27,000	22,132	9,205		
Kędzierzyn-Koźle	Opole	58,899	60,383	65,161	69,875						
Przemyśl	Podkarpackie	58,721	60,442	66,867	68,345		53,509	47,442	32,948		
Stalowa Wola	Podkarpackie	58,545	60,179	64,988	71,805		30,100	22,932	7,167		
Tczew	Pomeranian	59,111	59,828	60,271	61,124		41,000	33,696	24,619	12,808	
Biała Podlaska	Lublin	56,498	57,194	57,783	58,599		26,500	20,148	13,345		
Bełchatów	Łódź	55,583	56,740	61,496	61,018		9,250	7,327	5,146		
Świdnica	Lower Silesian	55,413	56,564	59,998	65,016		47,673	39,078	27,805	28,439	
Będzin	Silesian	55,183	56,191	58,639	60,084		42,800	39,478	34,410		
Zgierz	Łódź	54,974	55,985	58,164	58,862		43,025	36,666	26,169		
Piekary Śląskie (part of Katowice urban area)	Silesian	54,226	54,860	59,061	61,753		36,400	32,226	22,944		
Racibórz	Silesian	53,632	54,529	56,919	64,093		40,600	32,523	26,447	25,250	
Legionowo	Masovian	53,205	53,809	51,058	51,301		20,836	19,835			
Ostrołęka	Masovian	51,012	51,893	54,109	55,511		22,187	15,216	10,409		

== Cities alphabetically ==
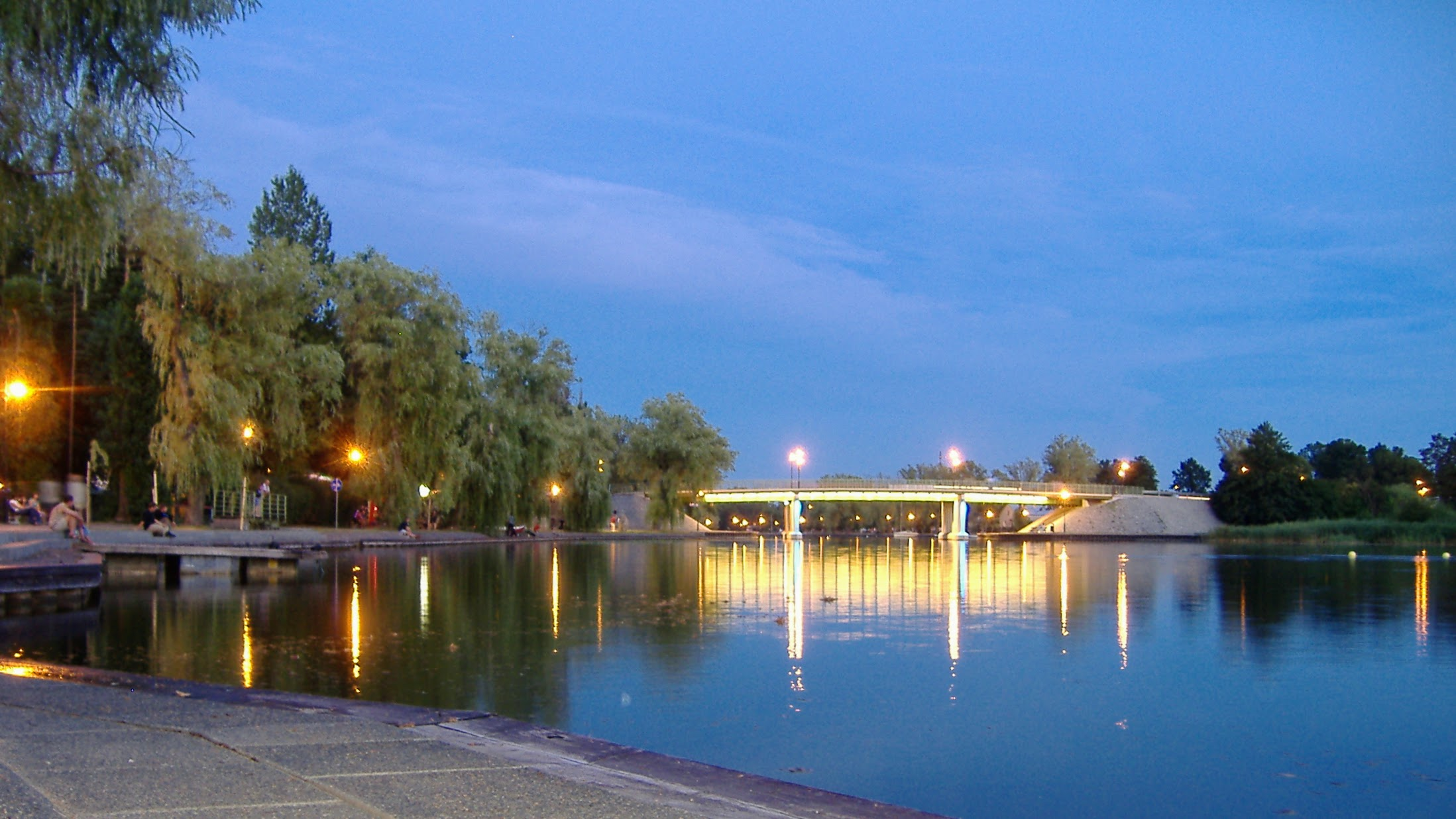
Augustów

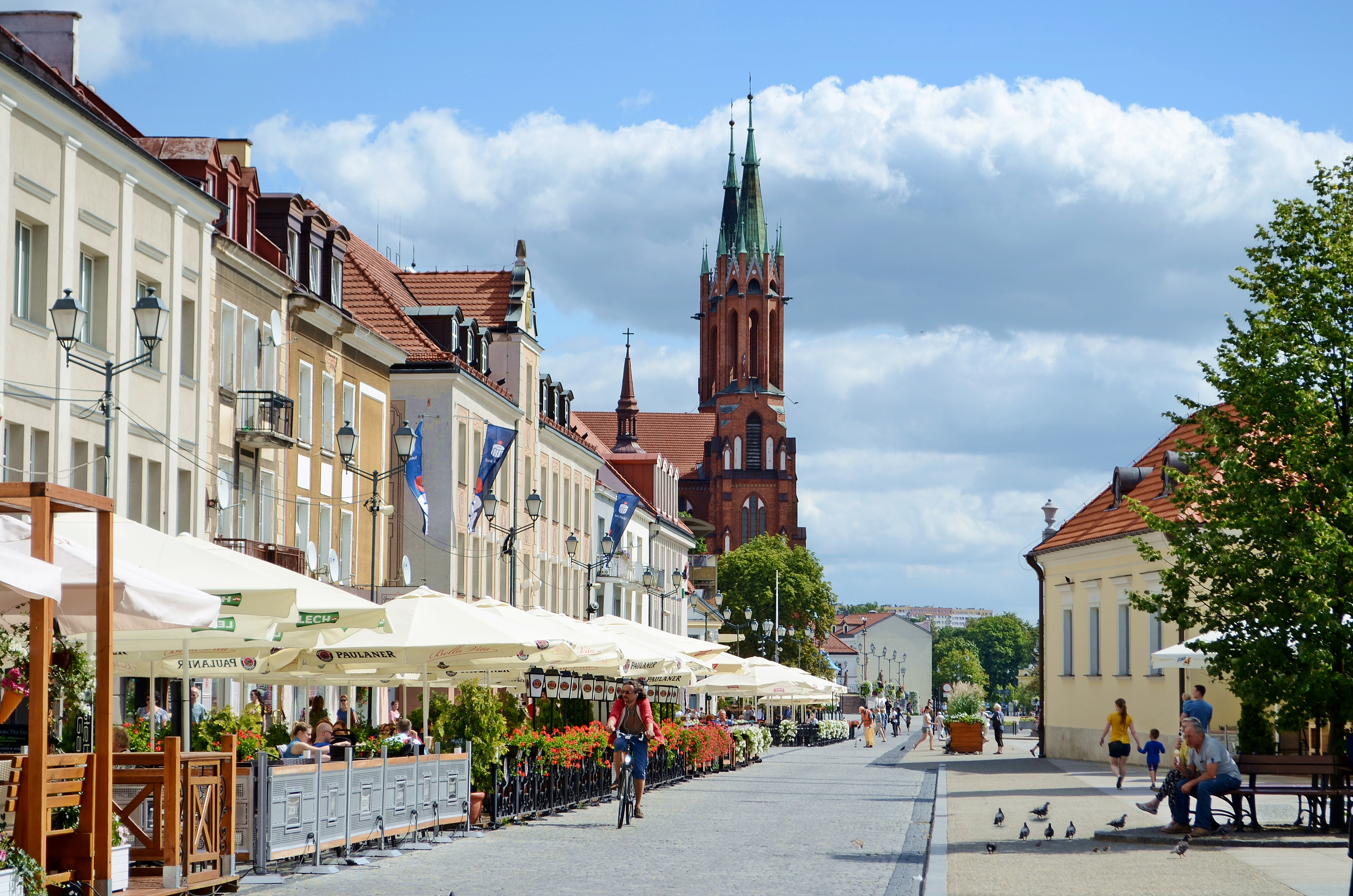
Białystok

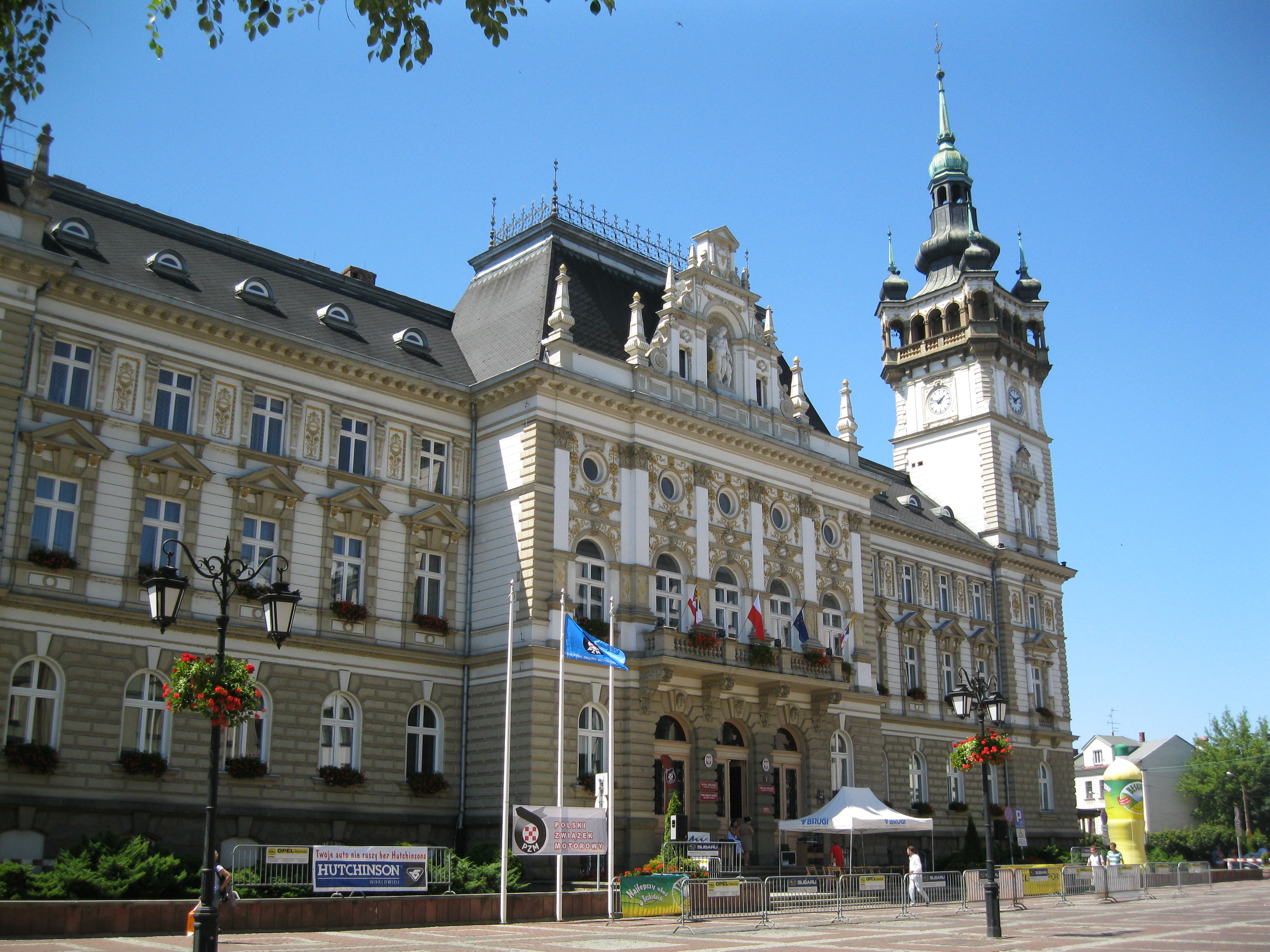
Bielsko-Biała

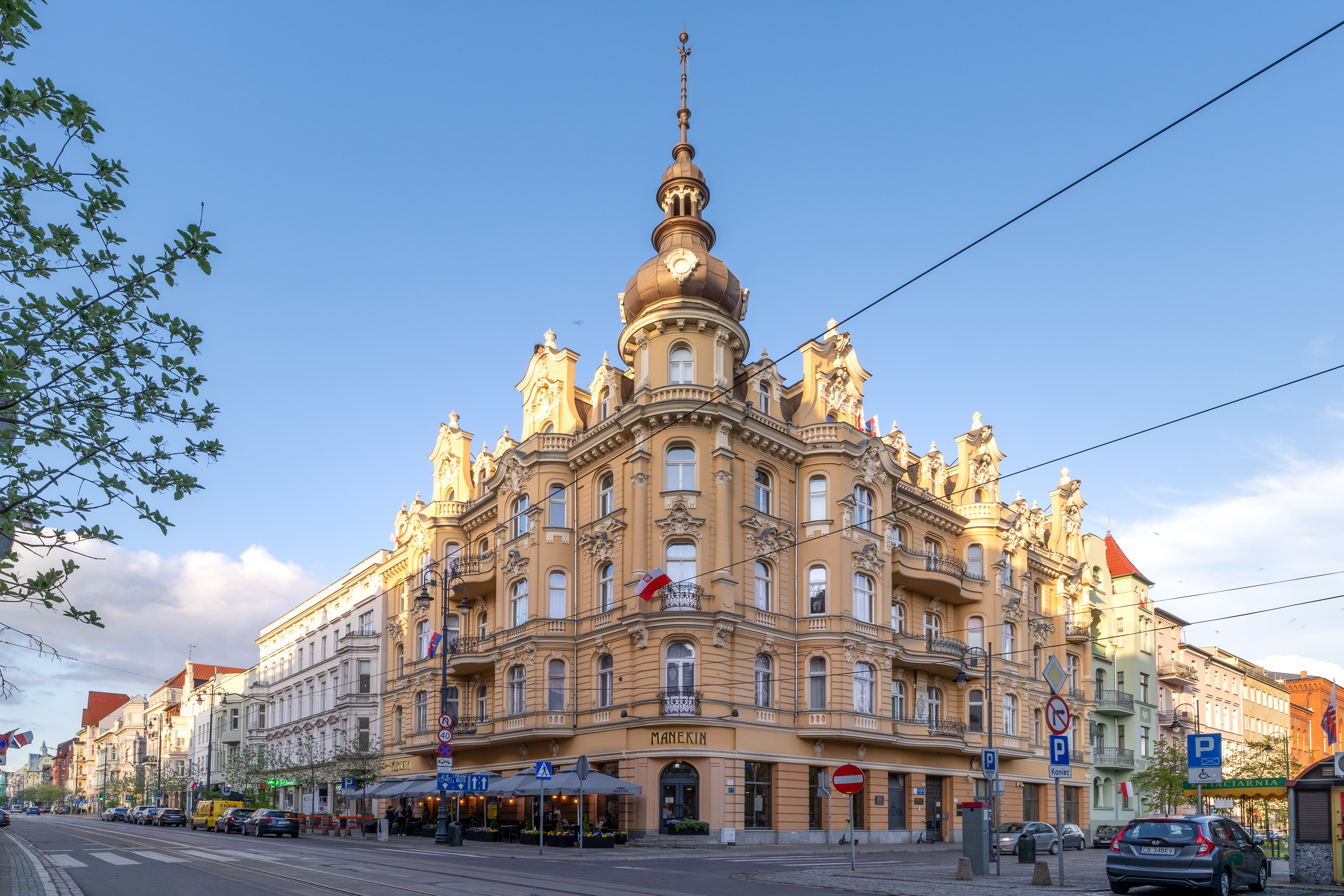
Bydgoszcz

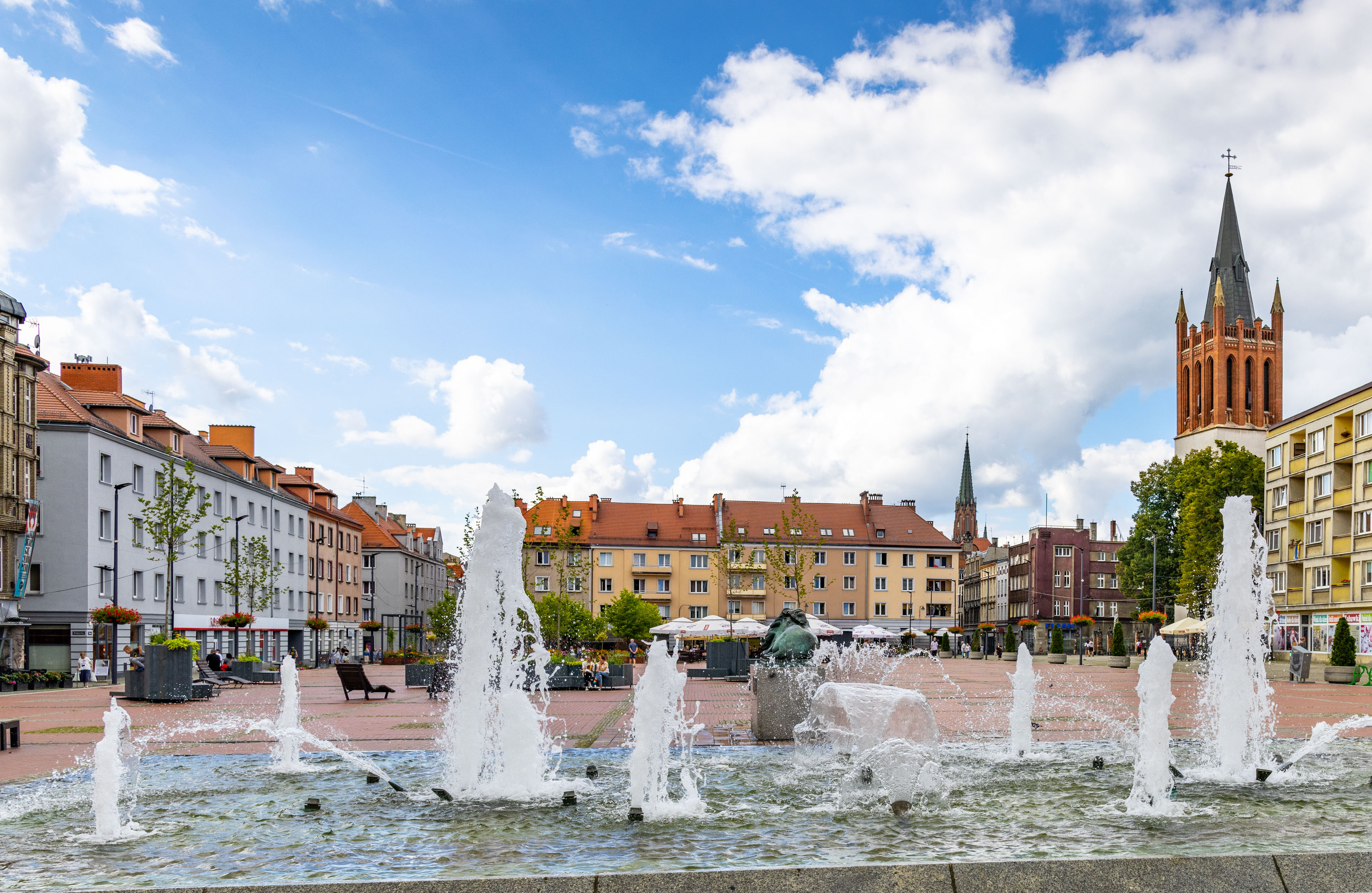
Bytom

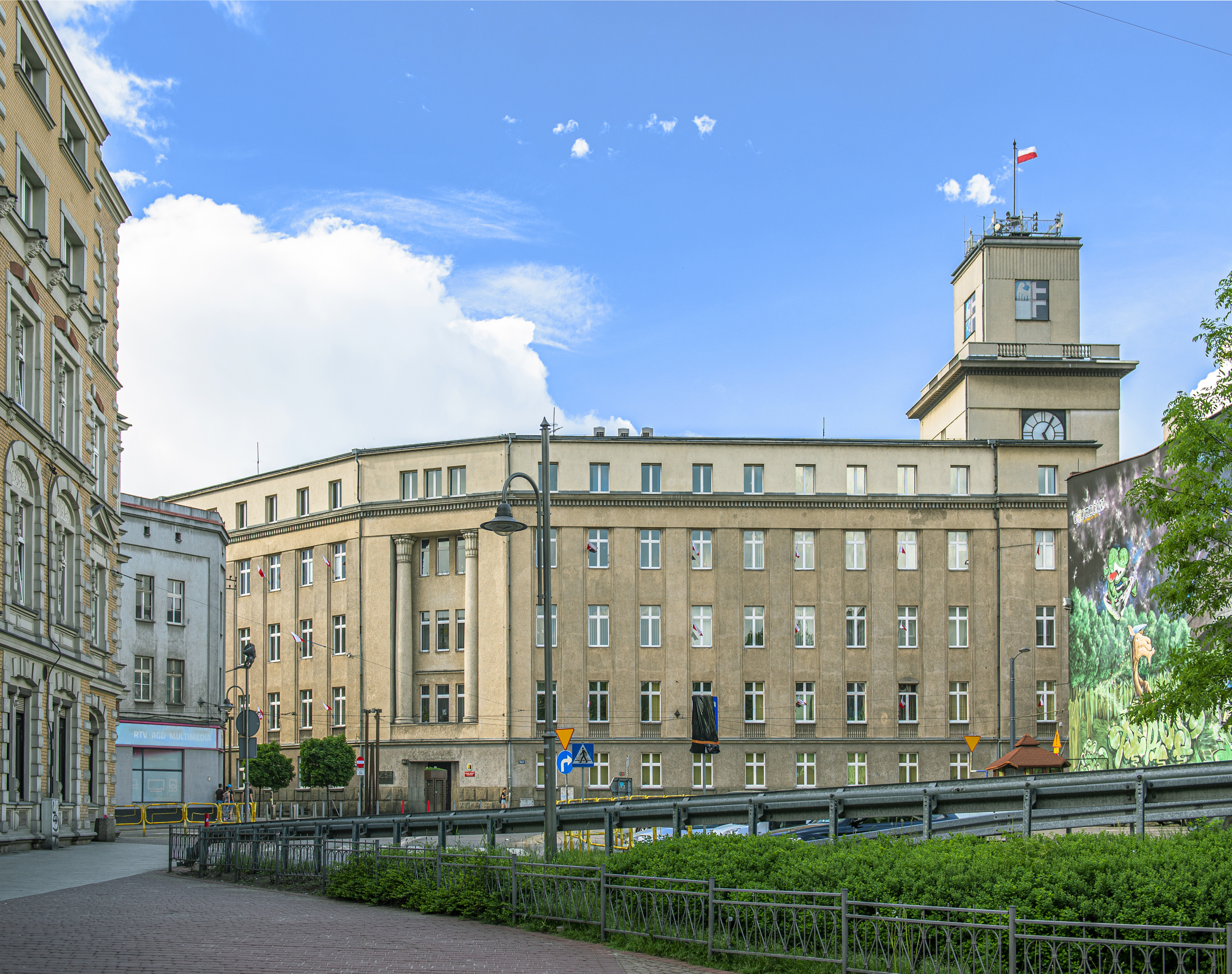
Chorzów

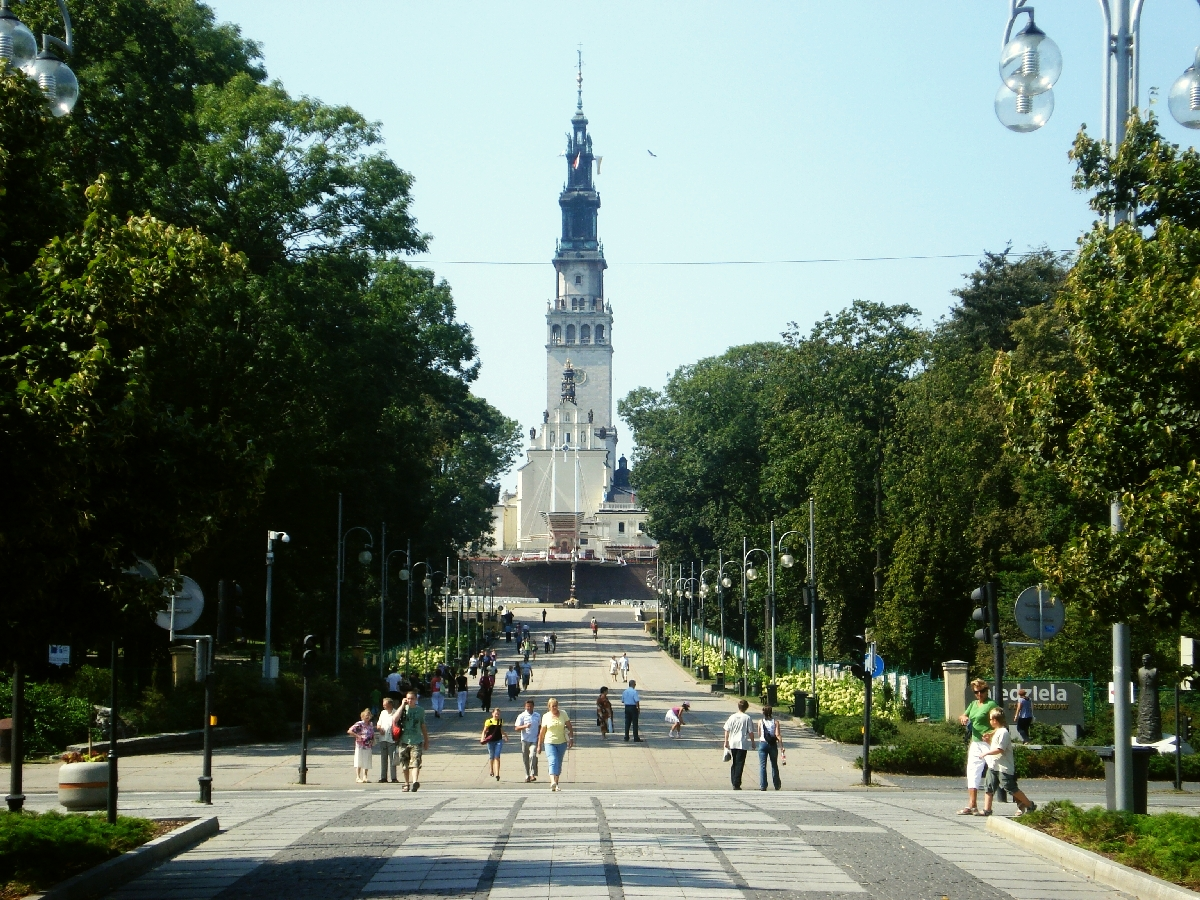
Częstochowa

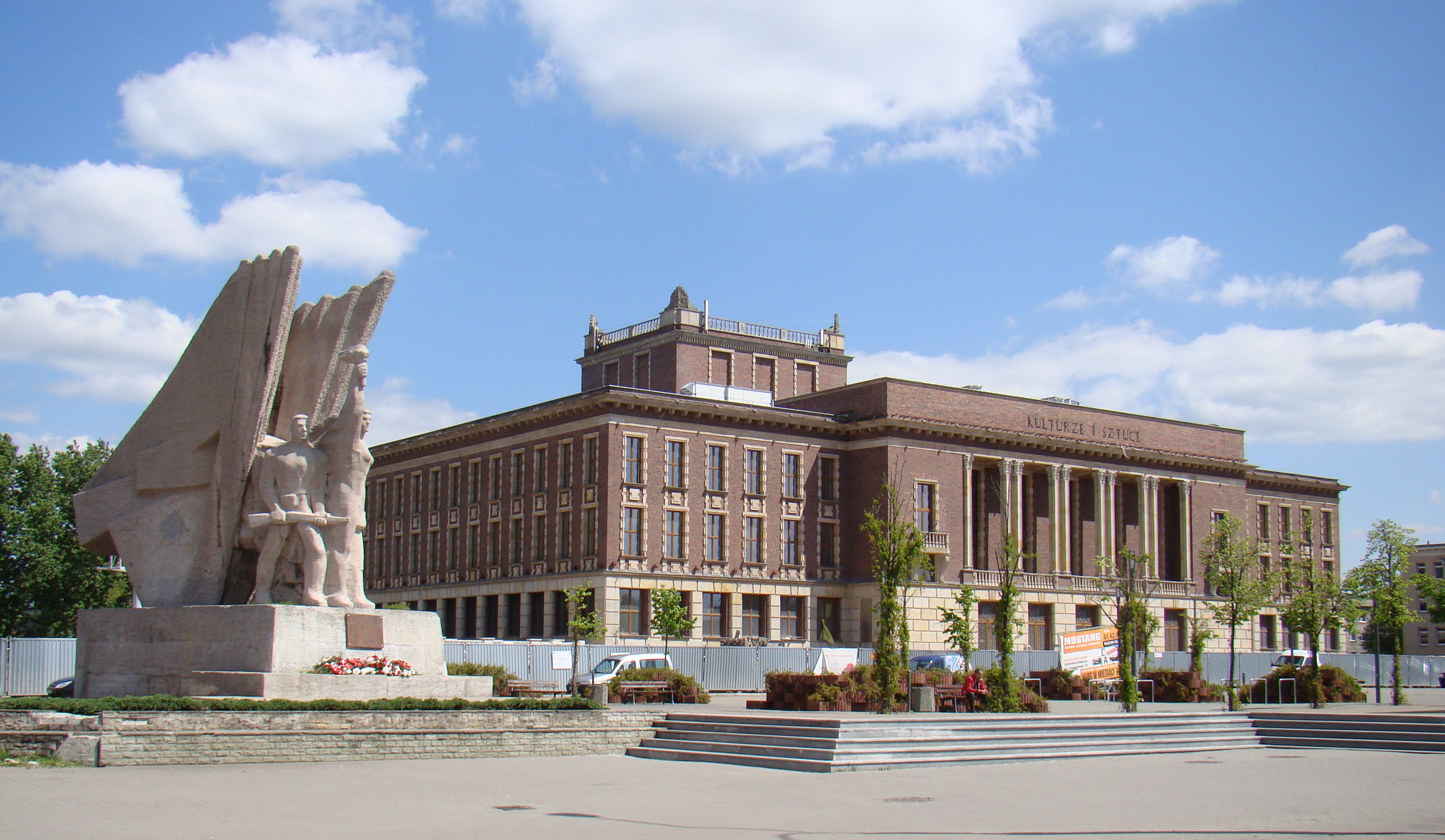
Dąbrowa Górnicza

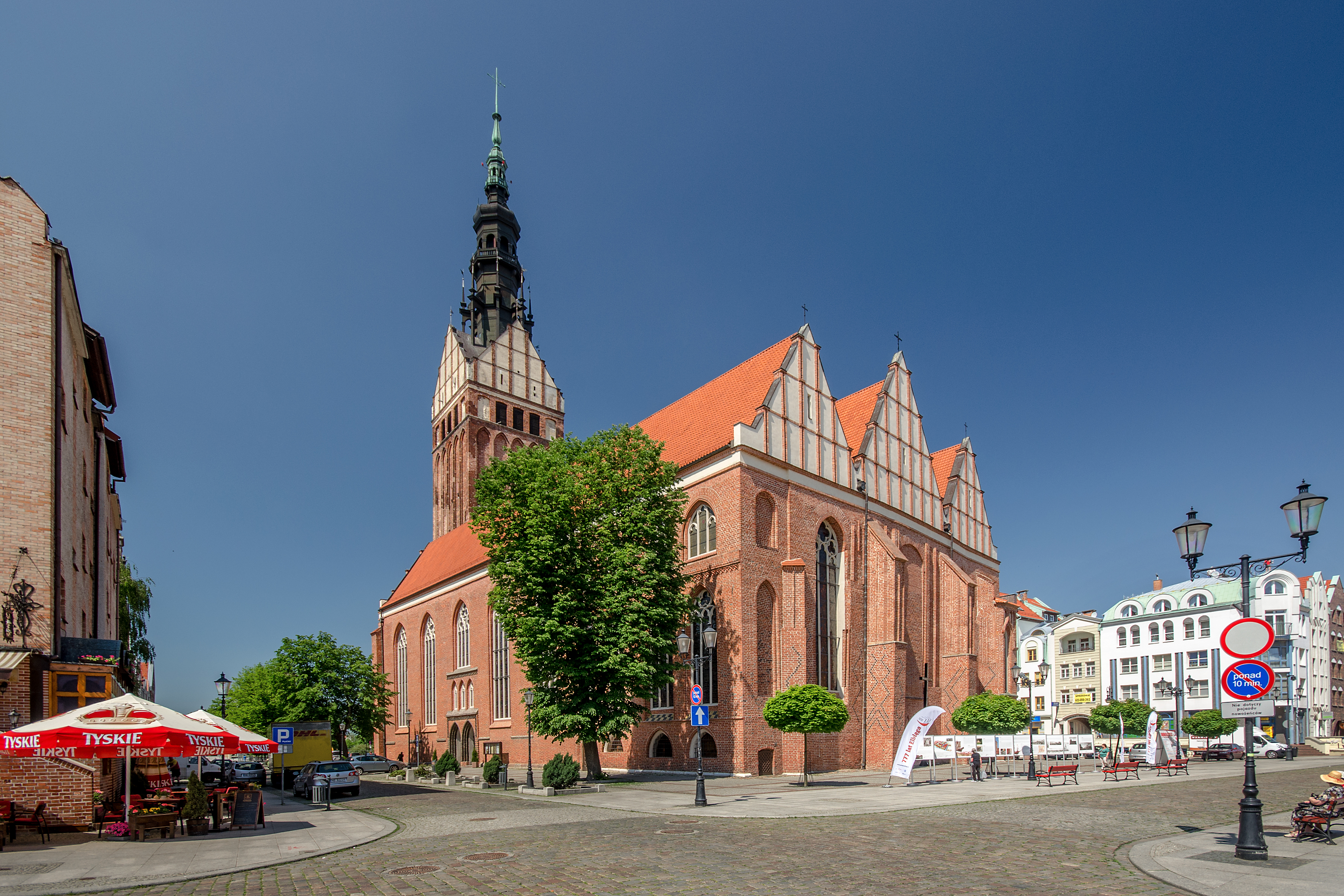
Elbląg

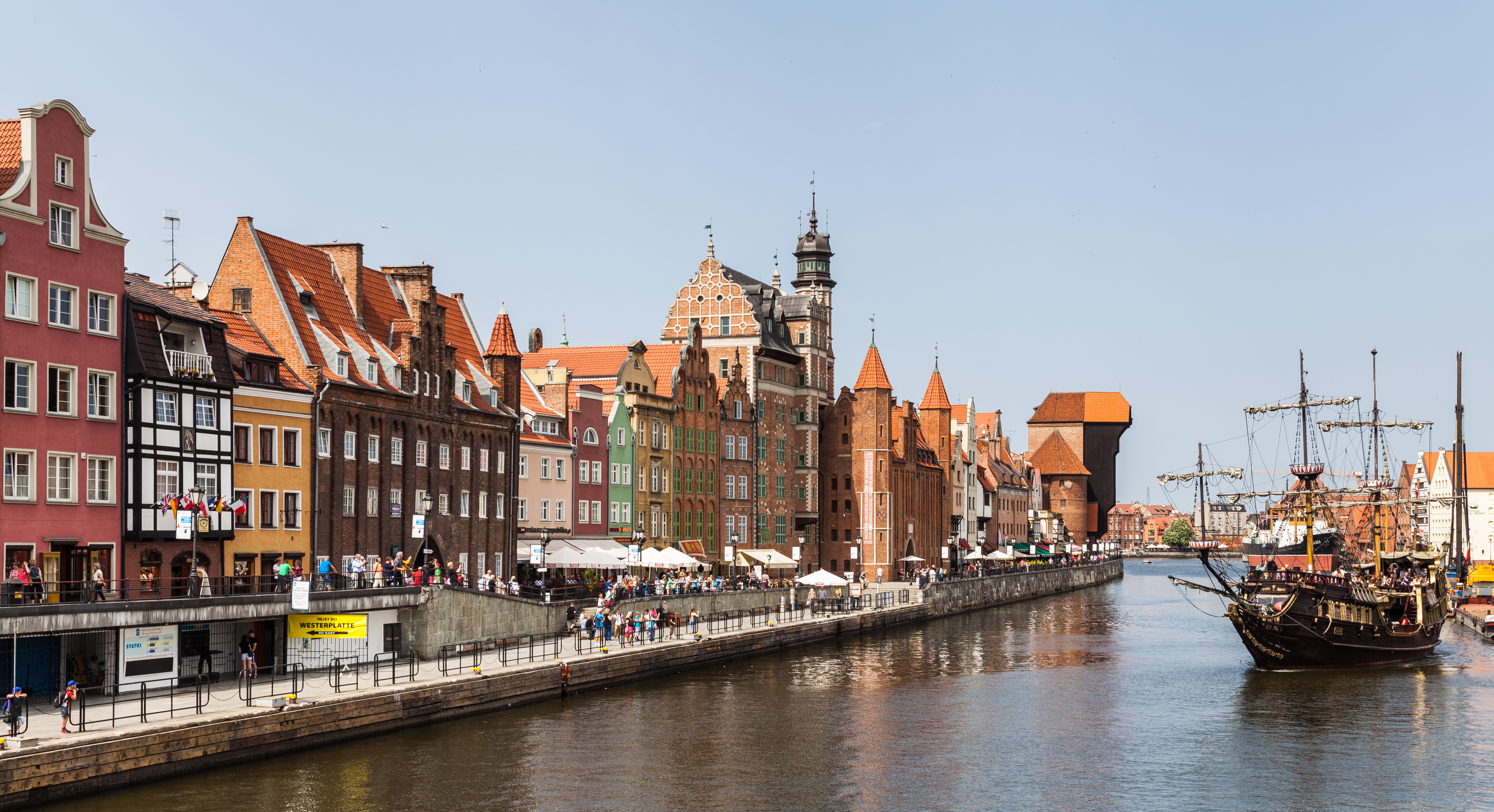
Gdańsk

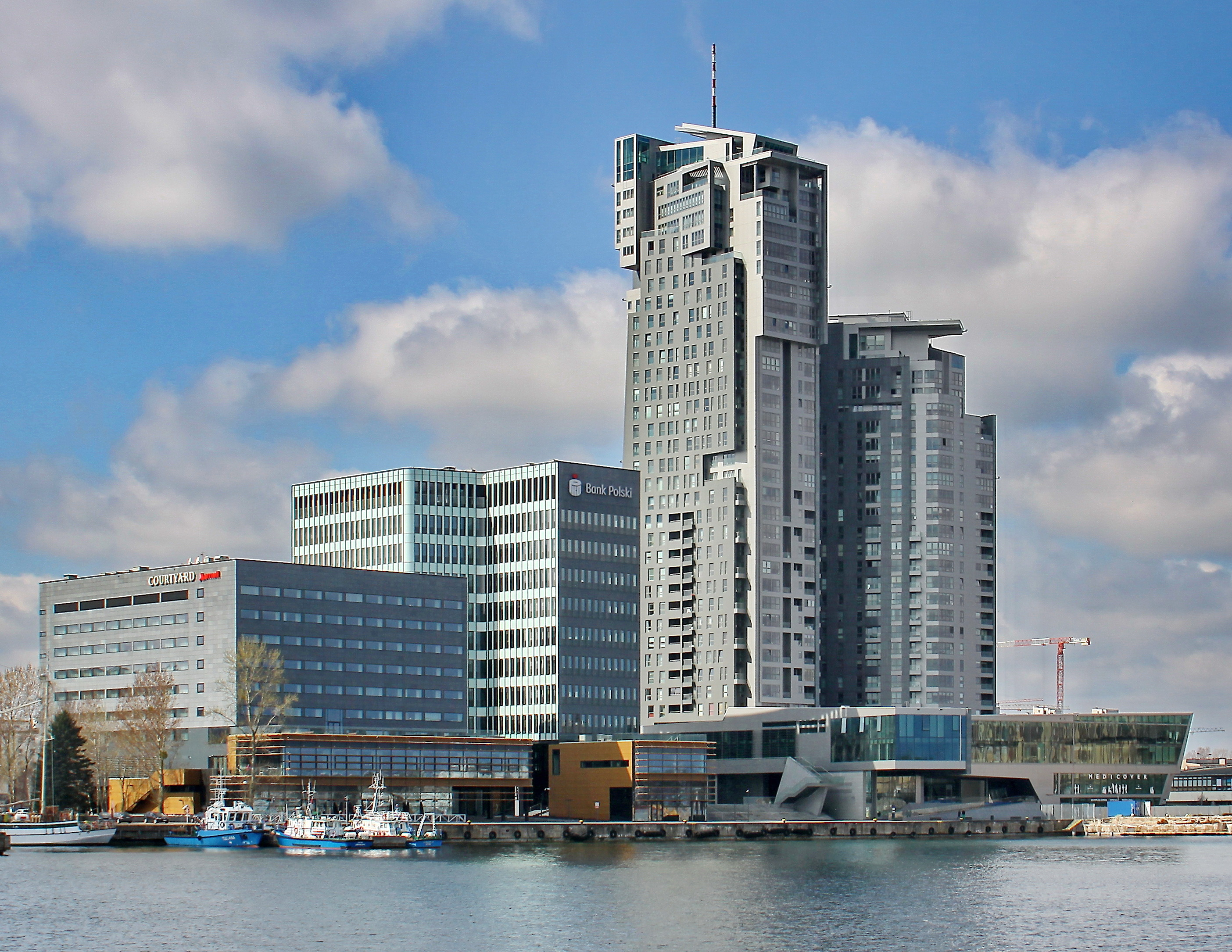
Gdynia

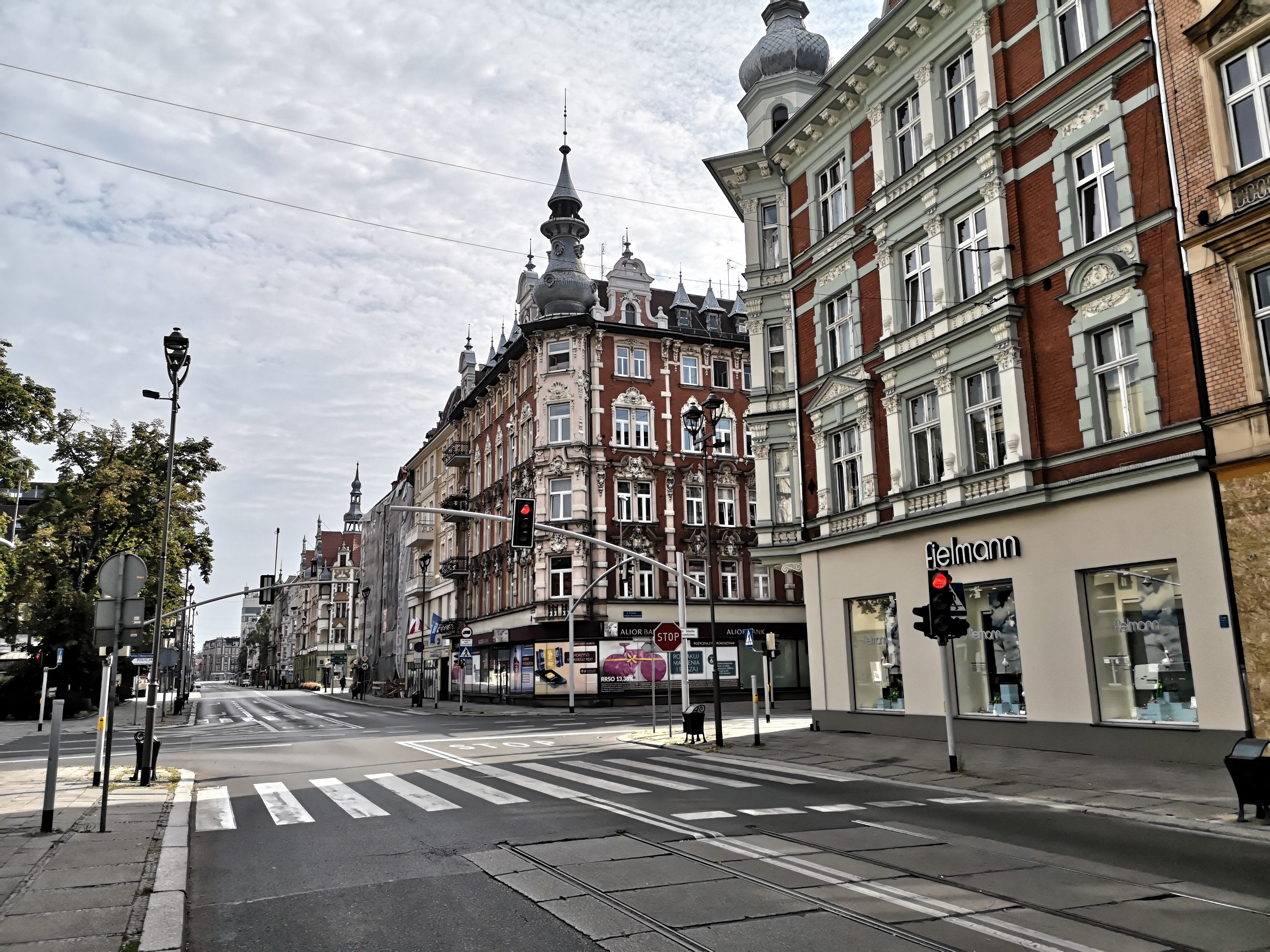
Gliwice

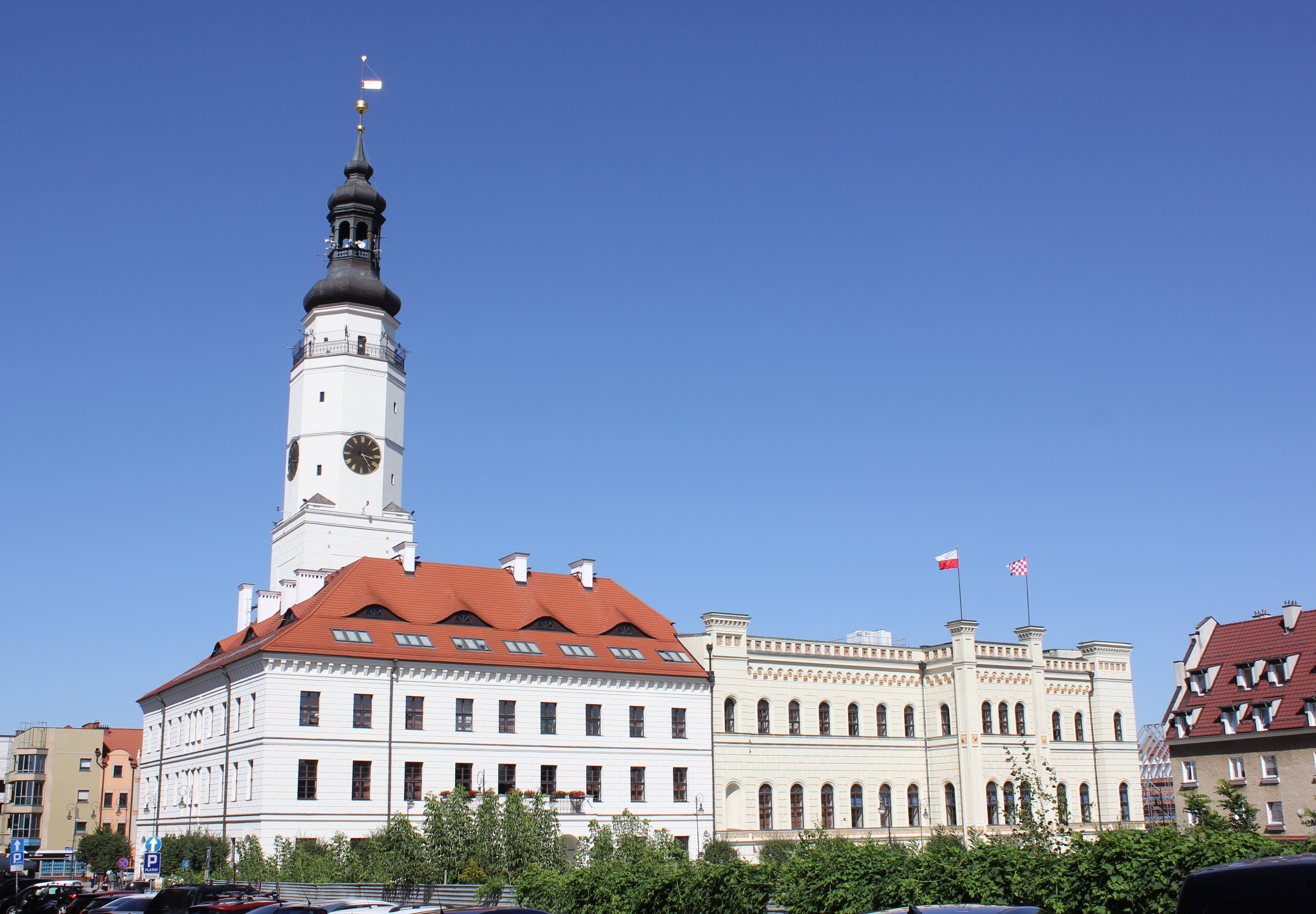
Głogów

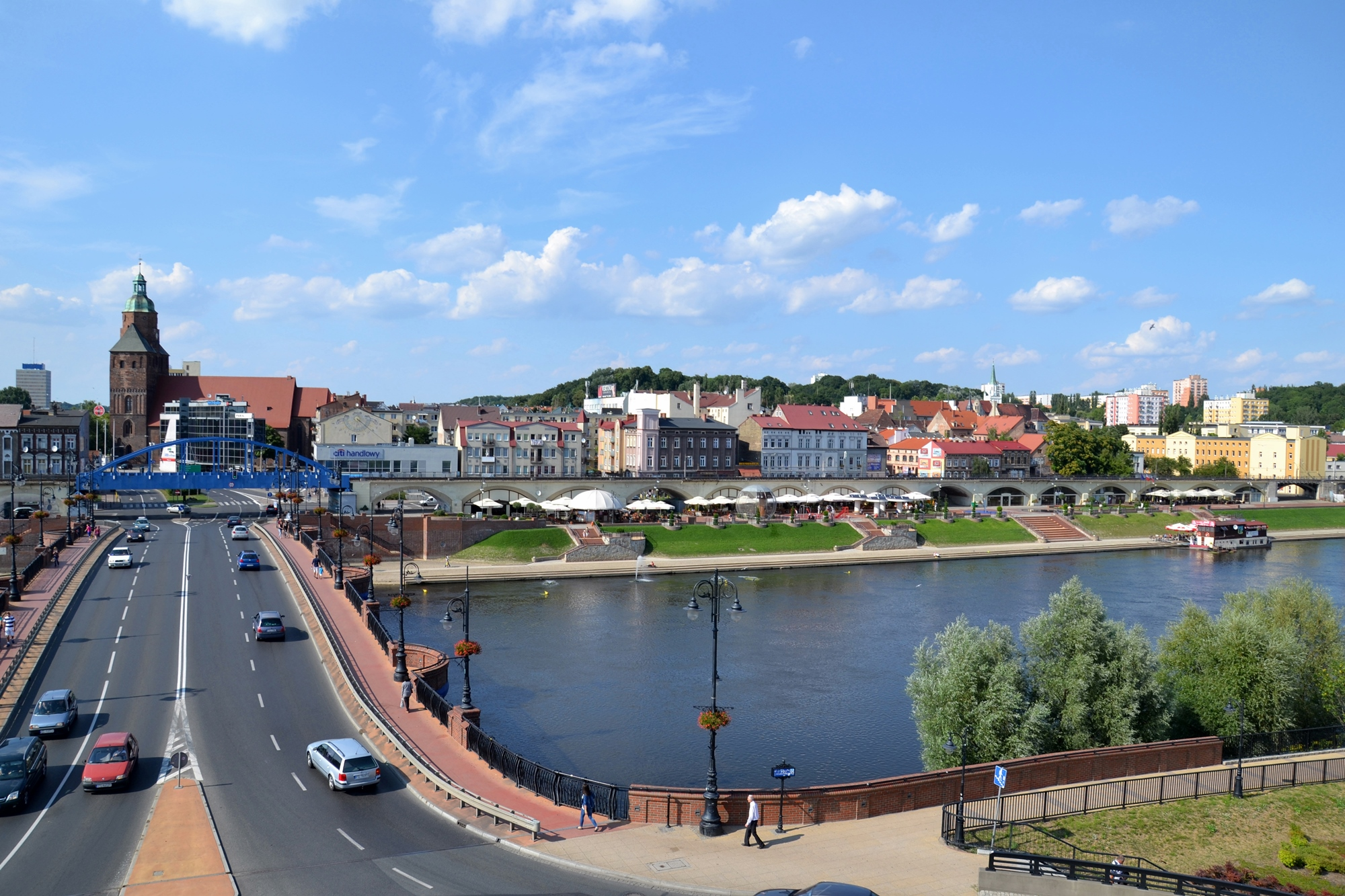
Gorzów Wielkopolski

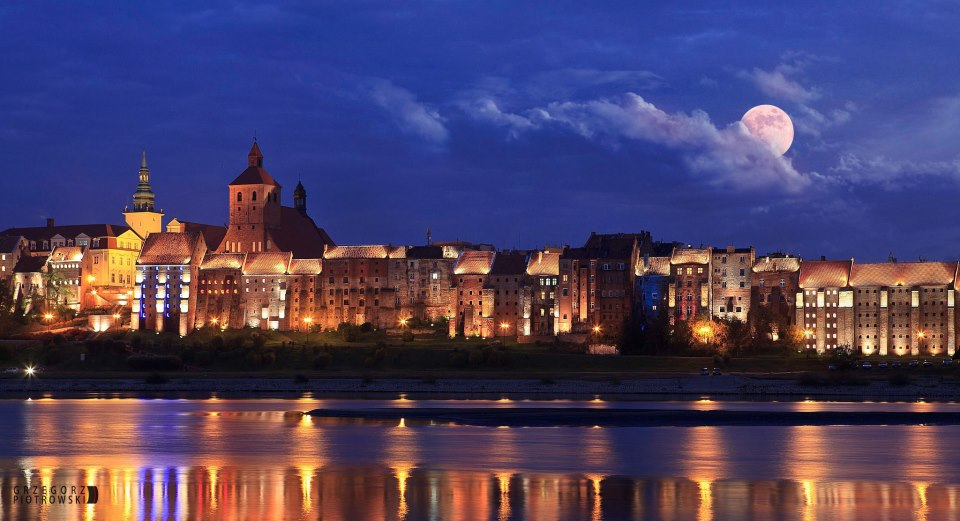
Grudziądz

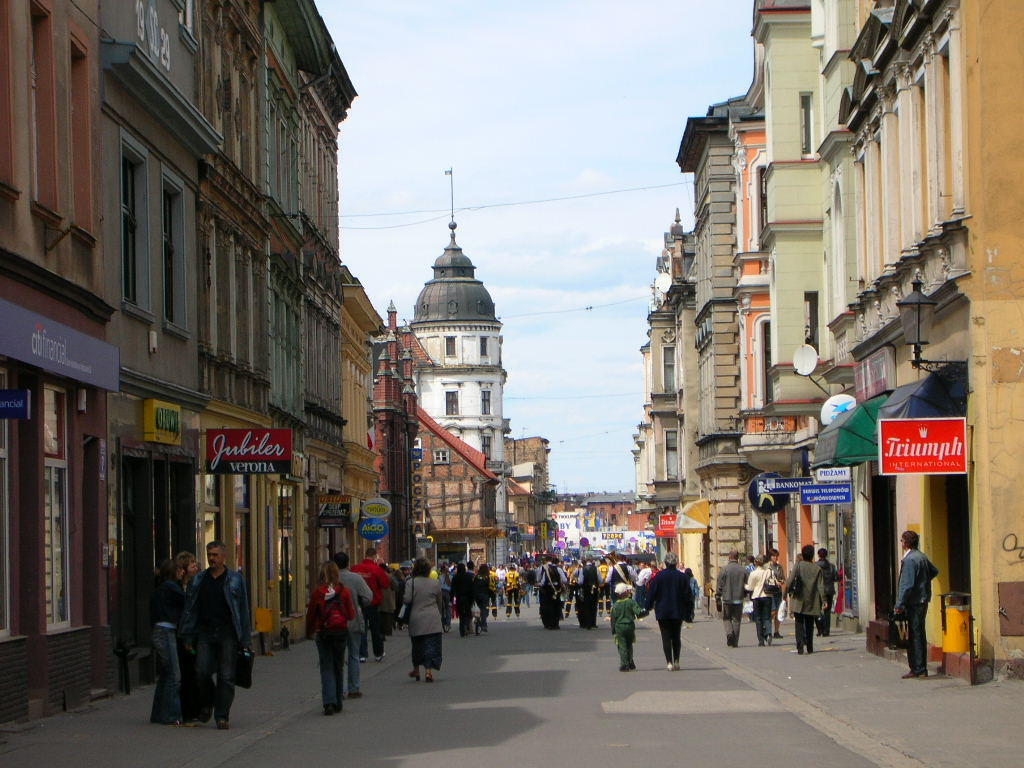
Inowrocław

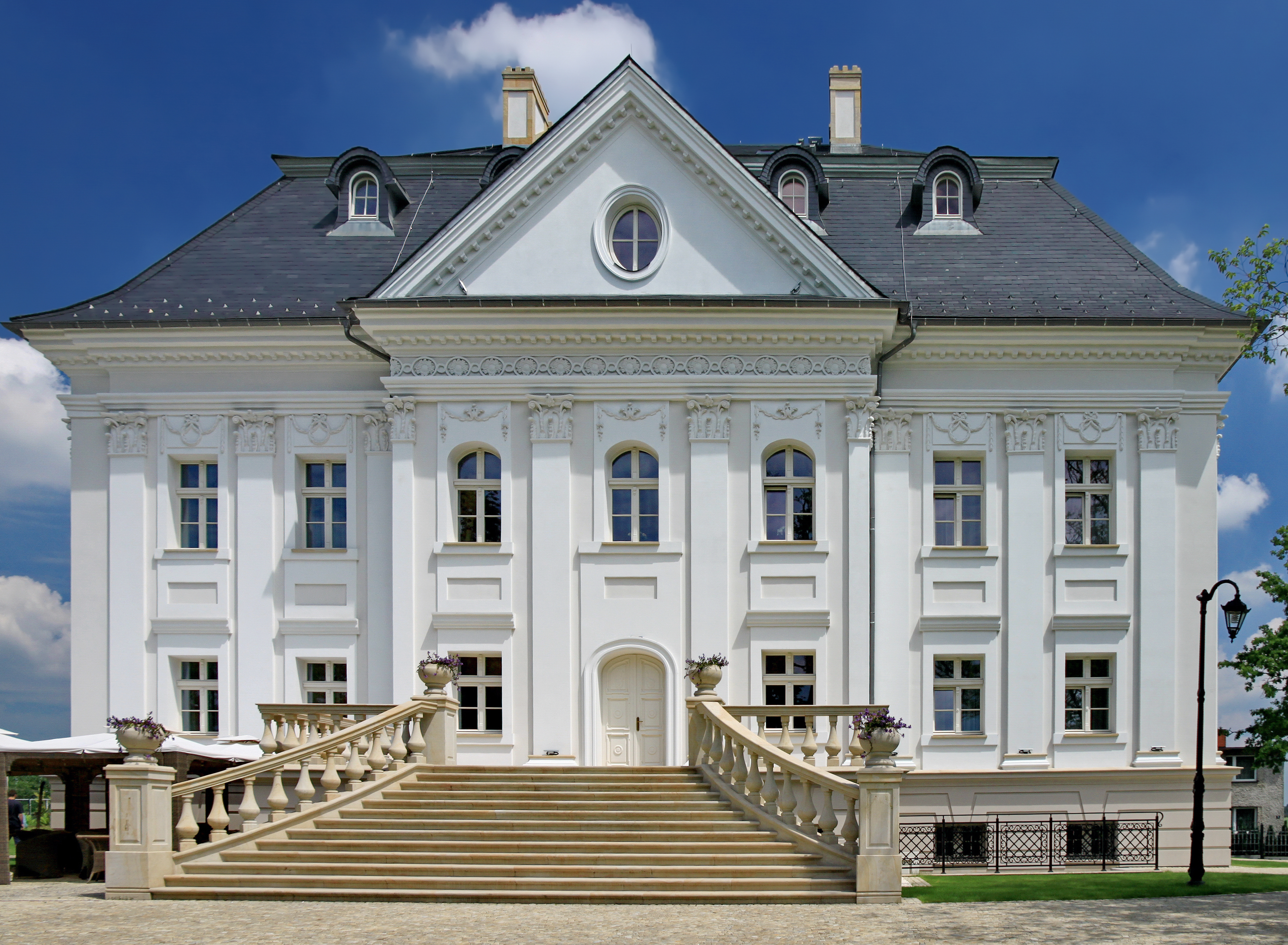
Jastrzębie-Zdrój

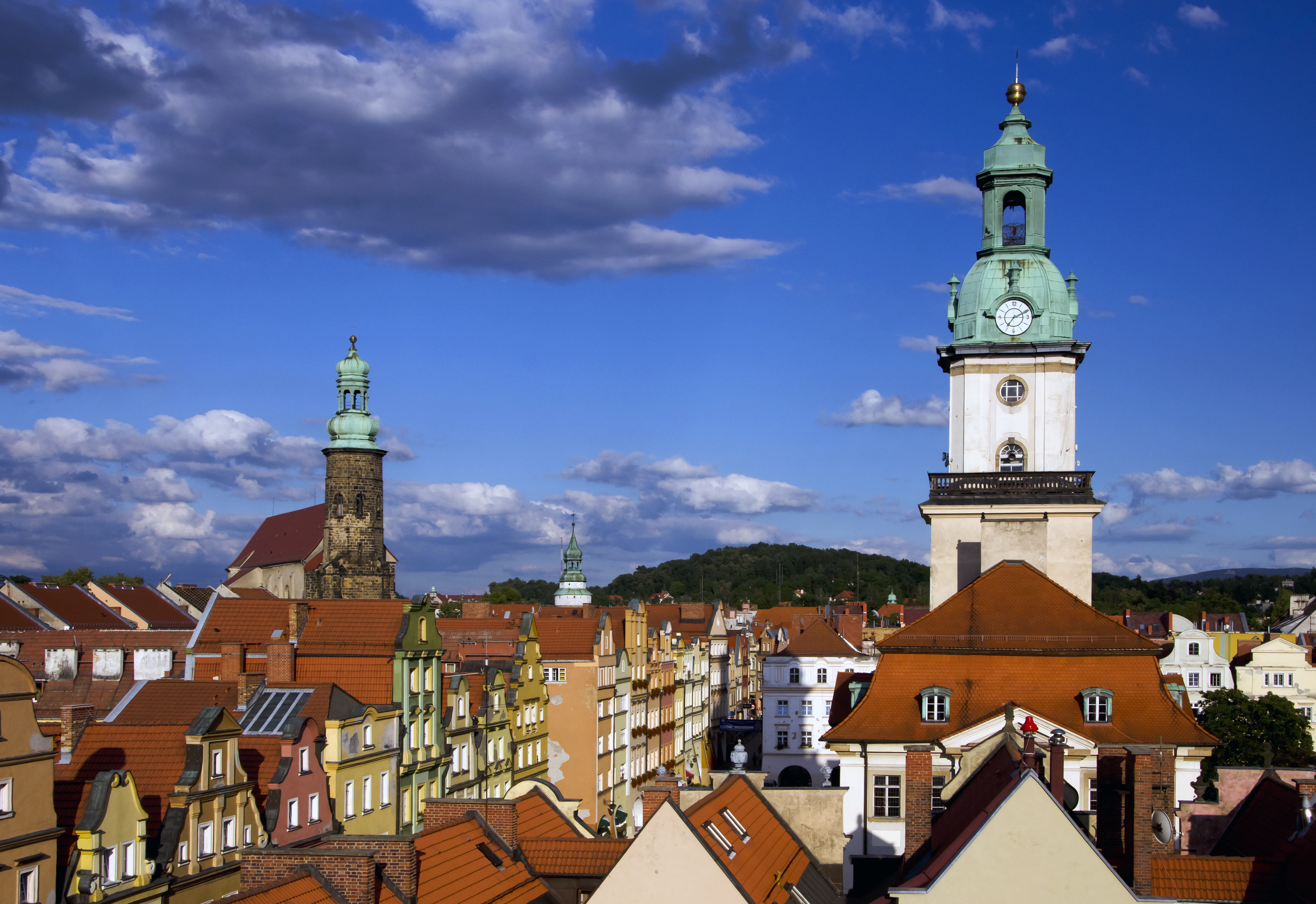
Jelenia Góra

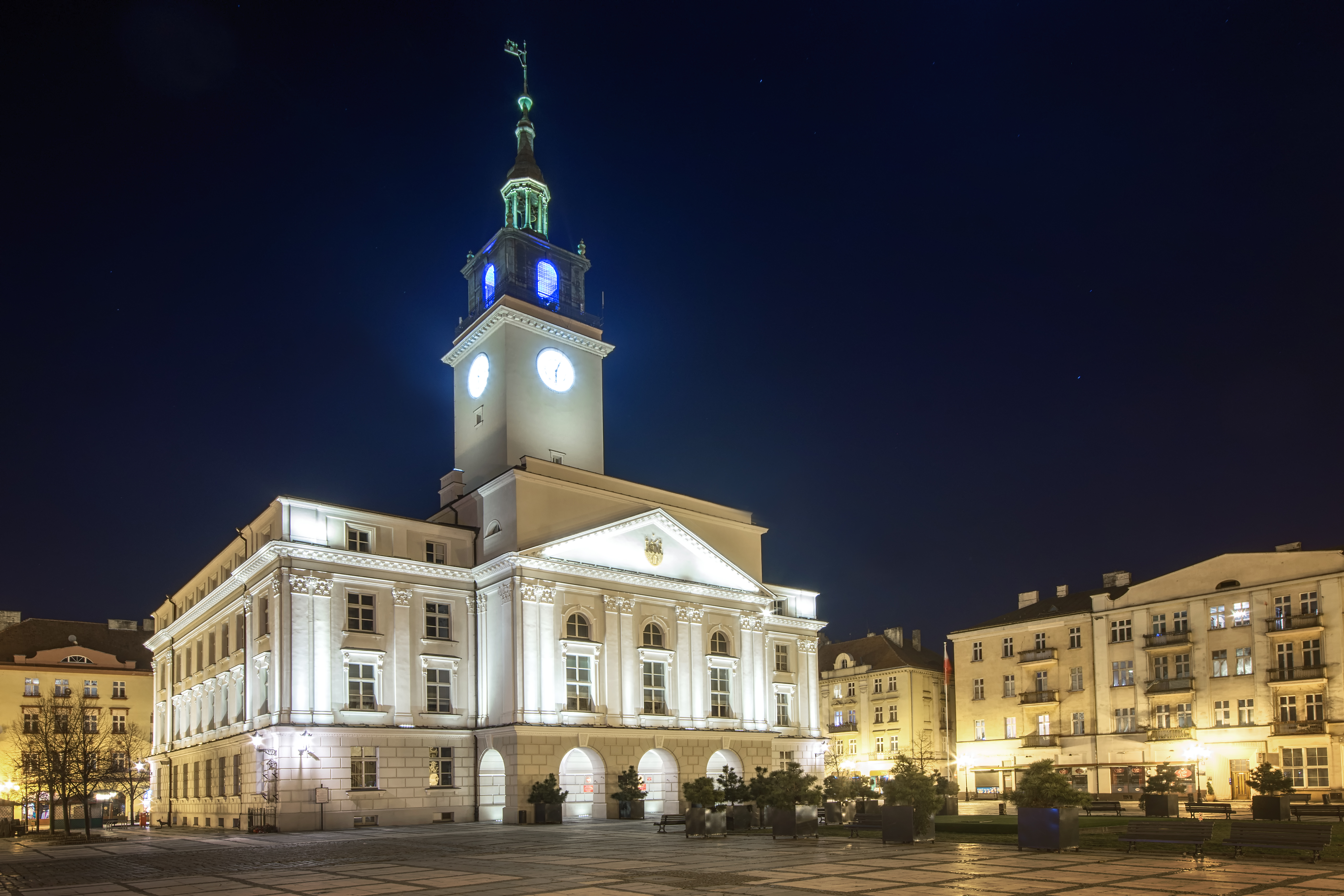
Kalisz

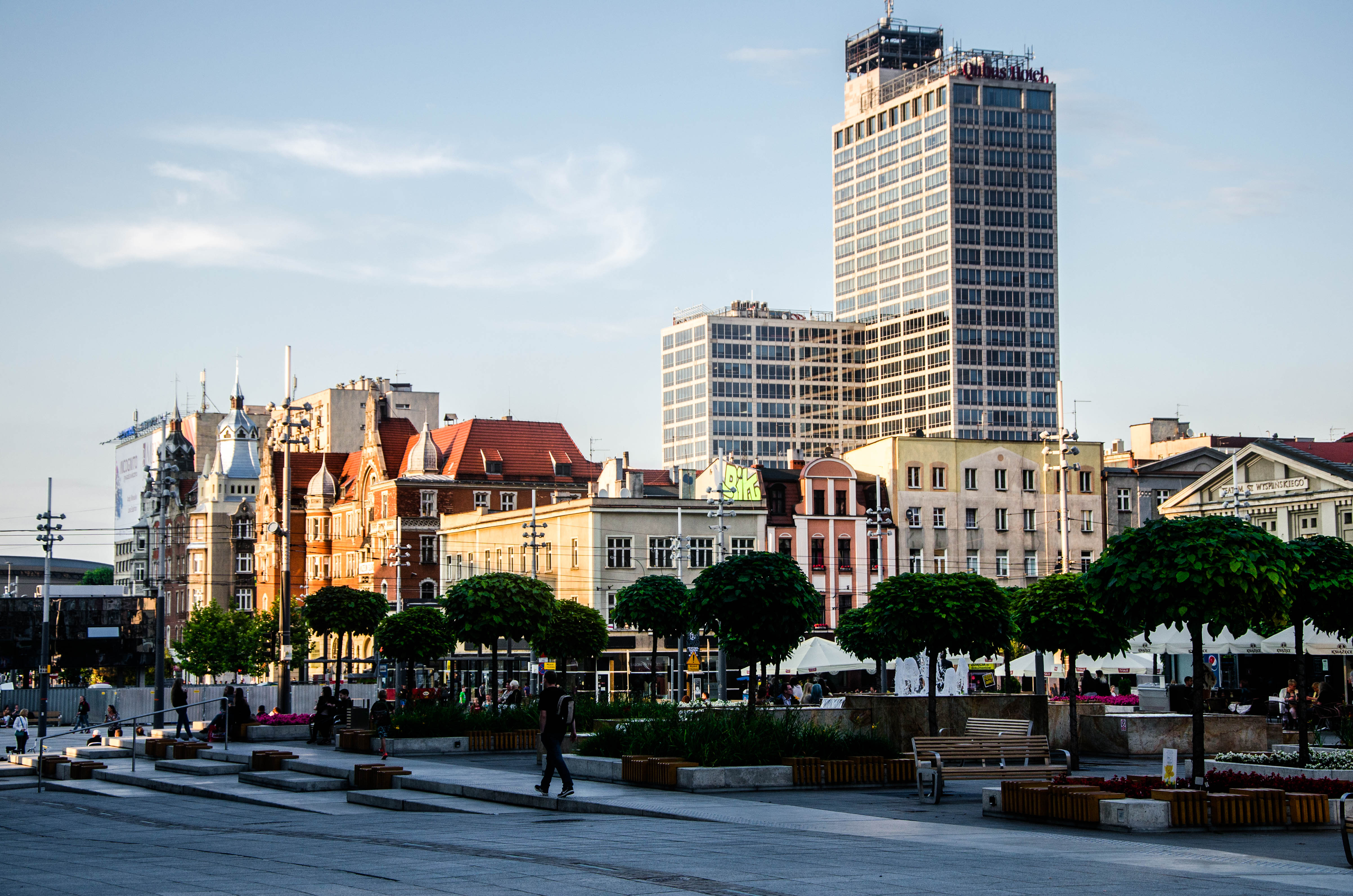
Katowice

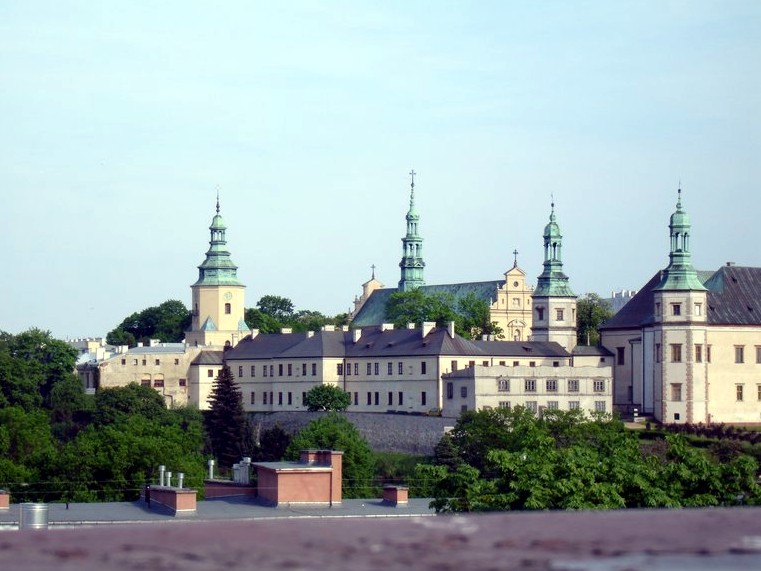
Kielce

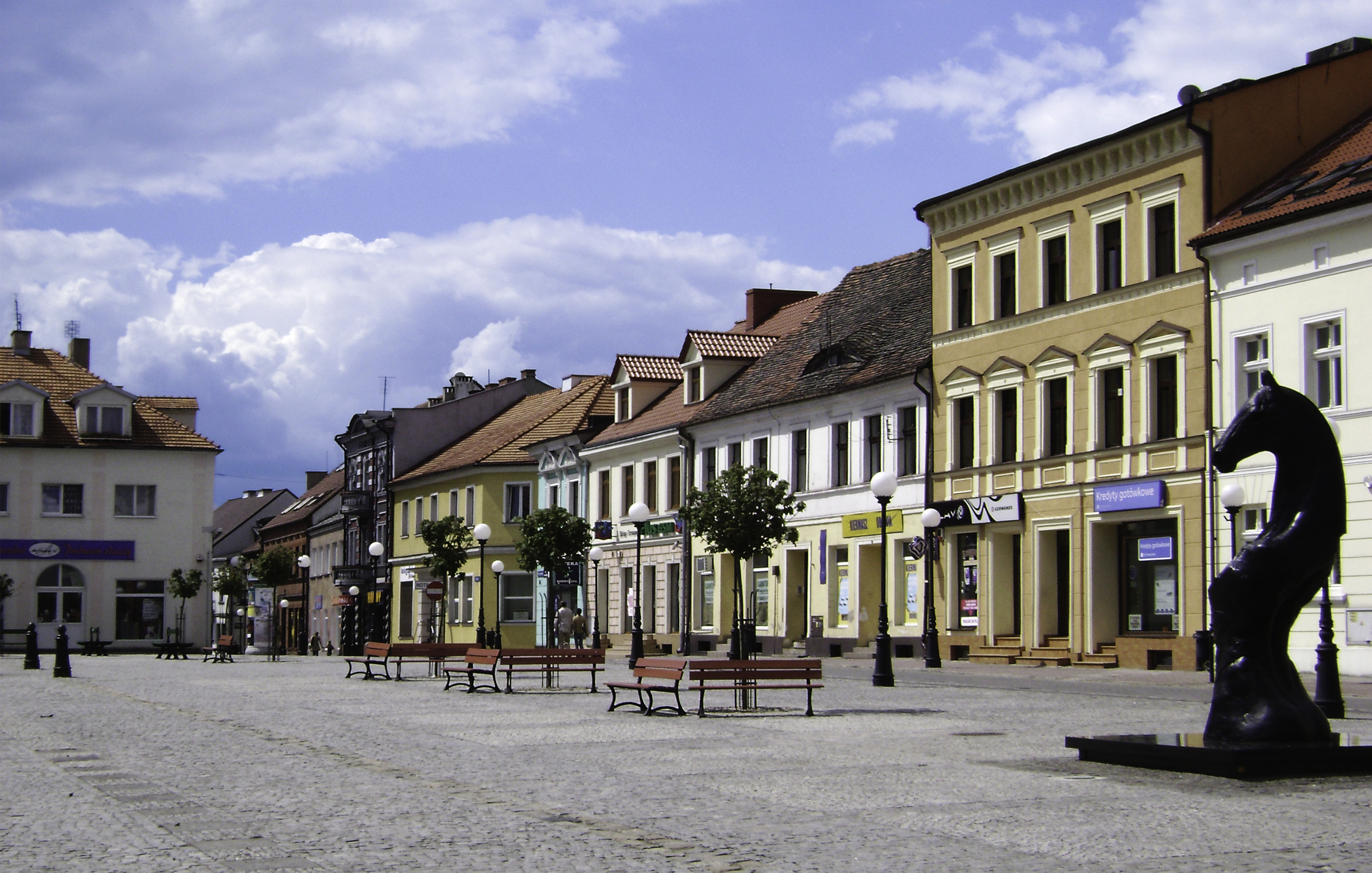
Konin

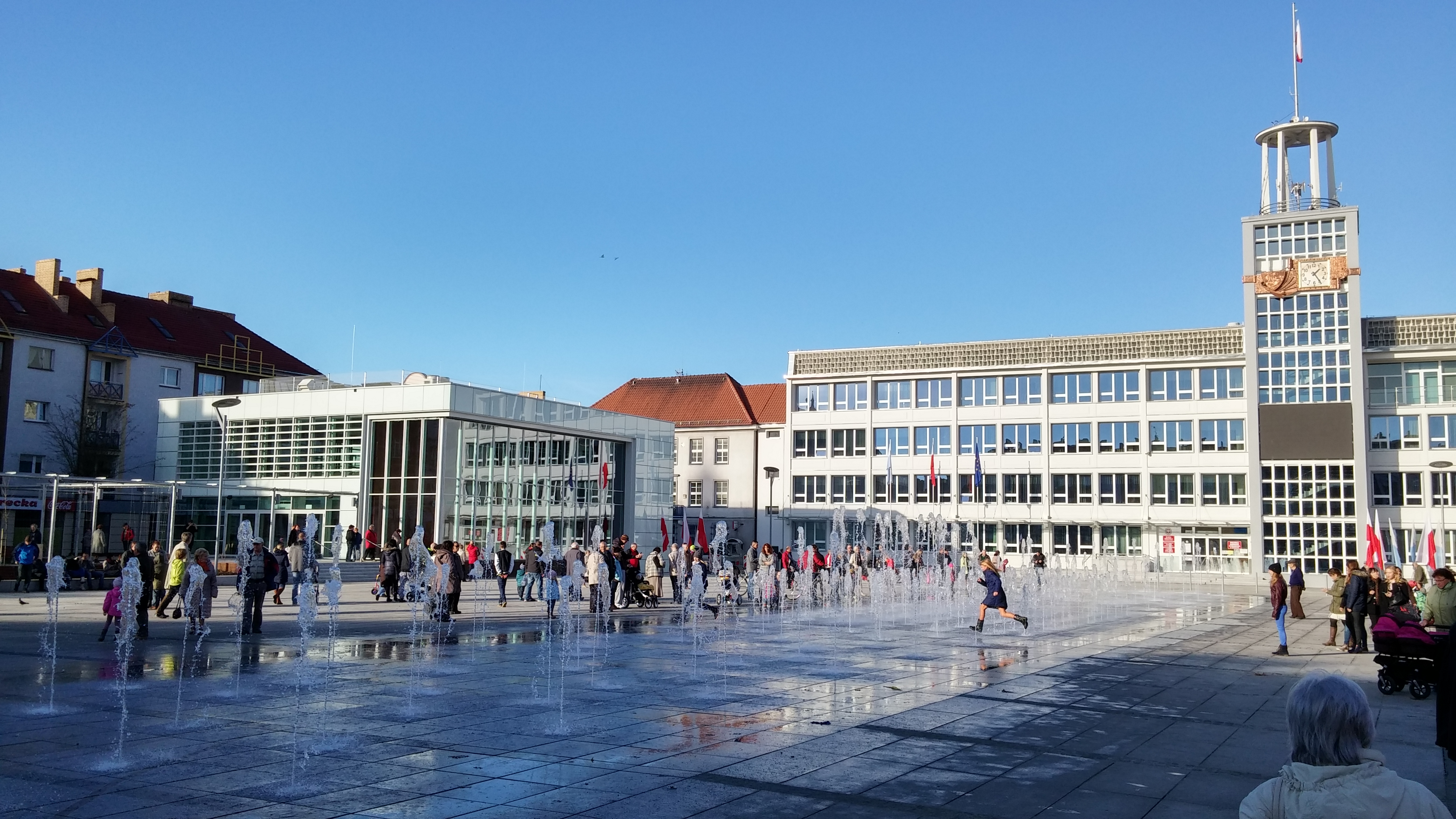
Koszalin

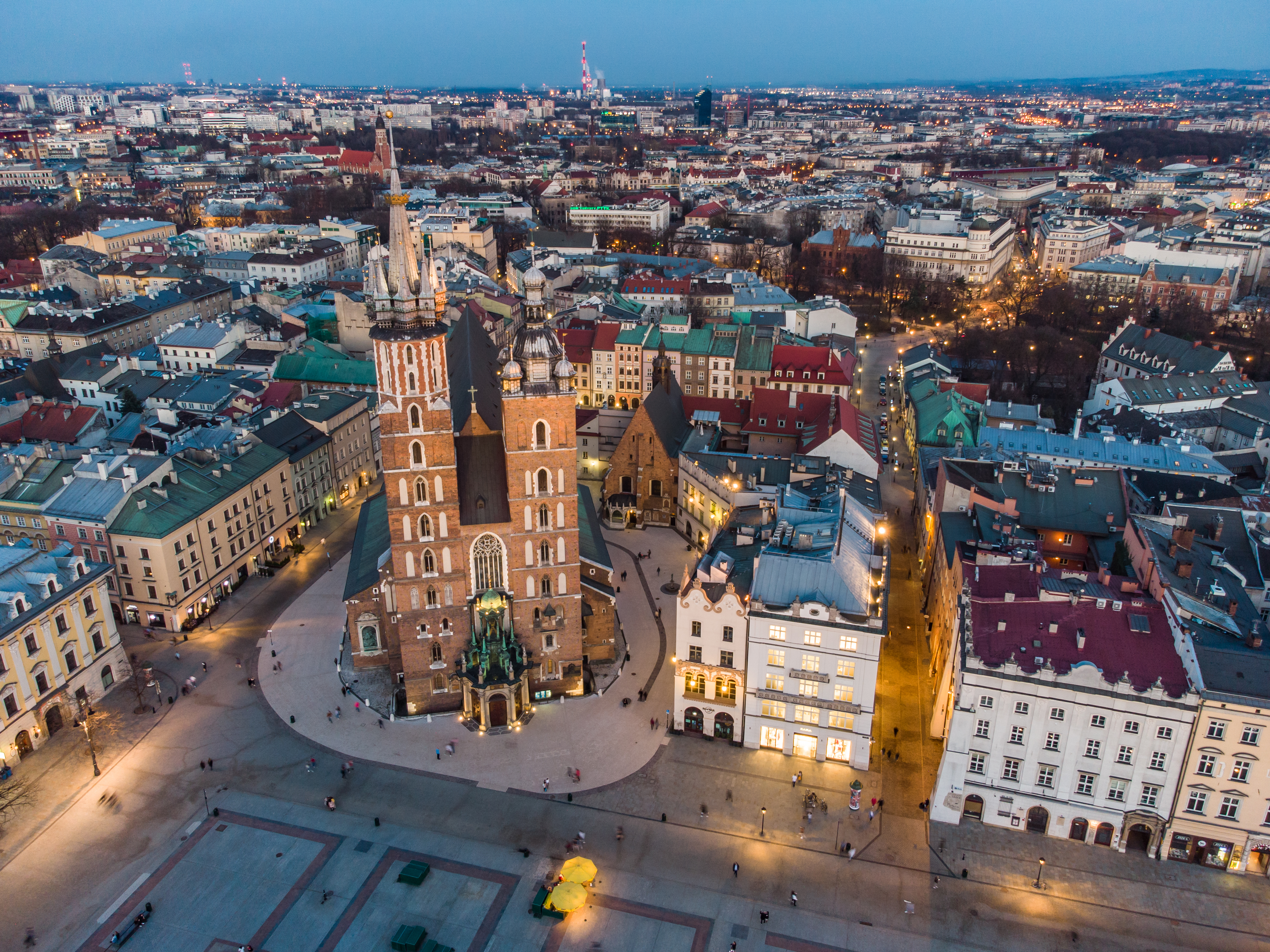
Kraków

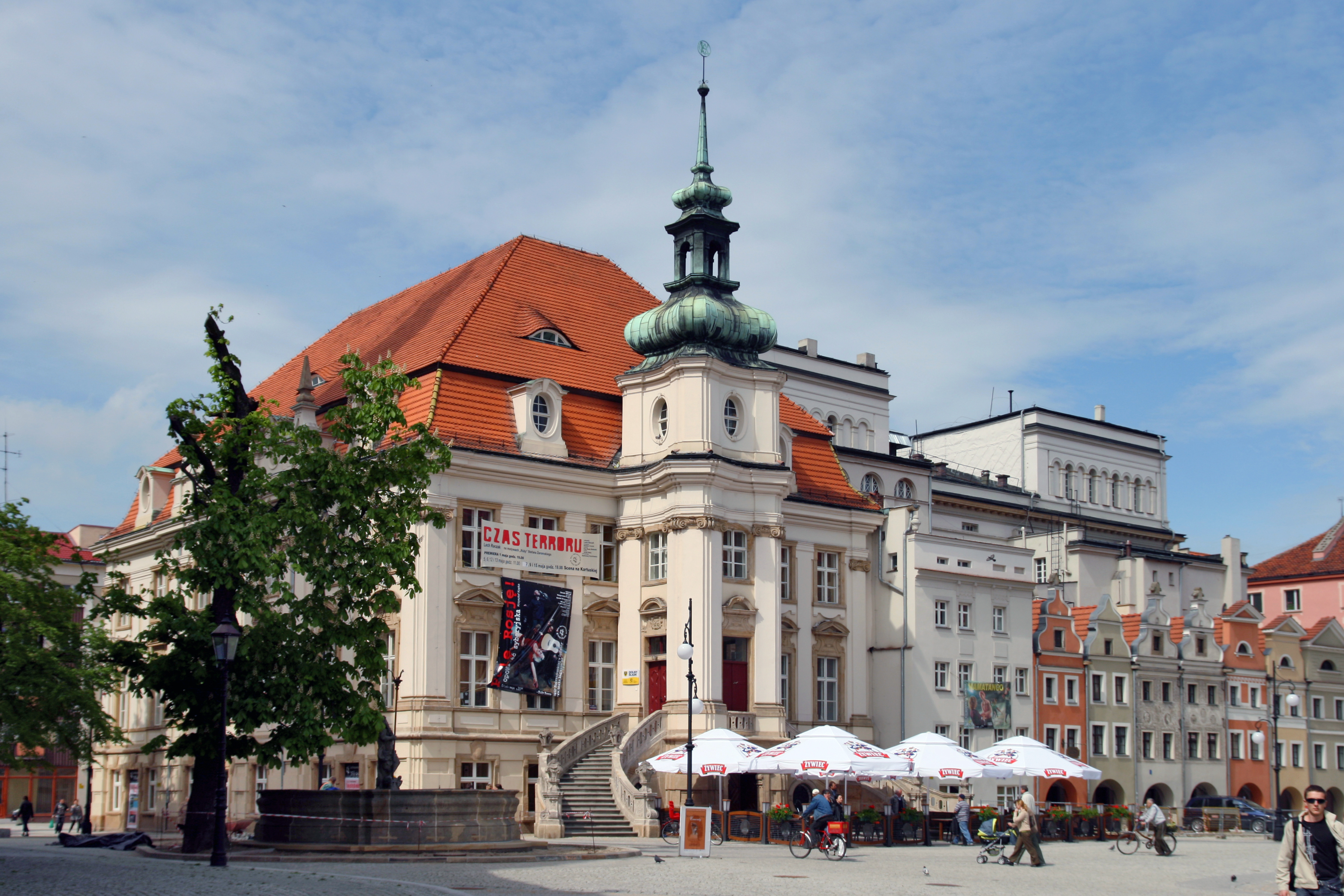
Legnica

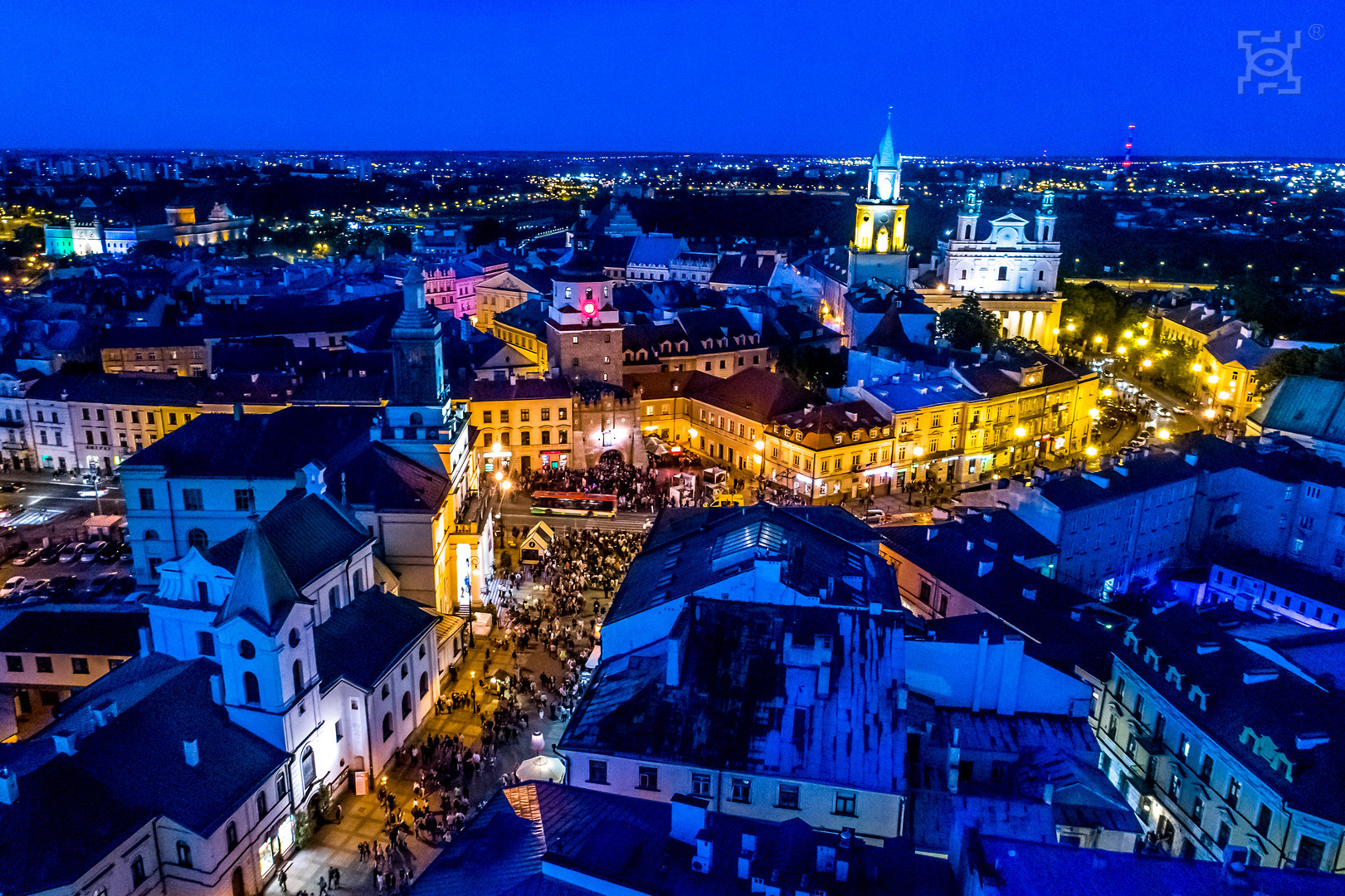
Lublin

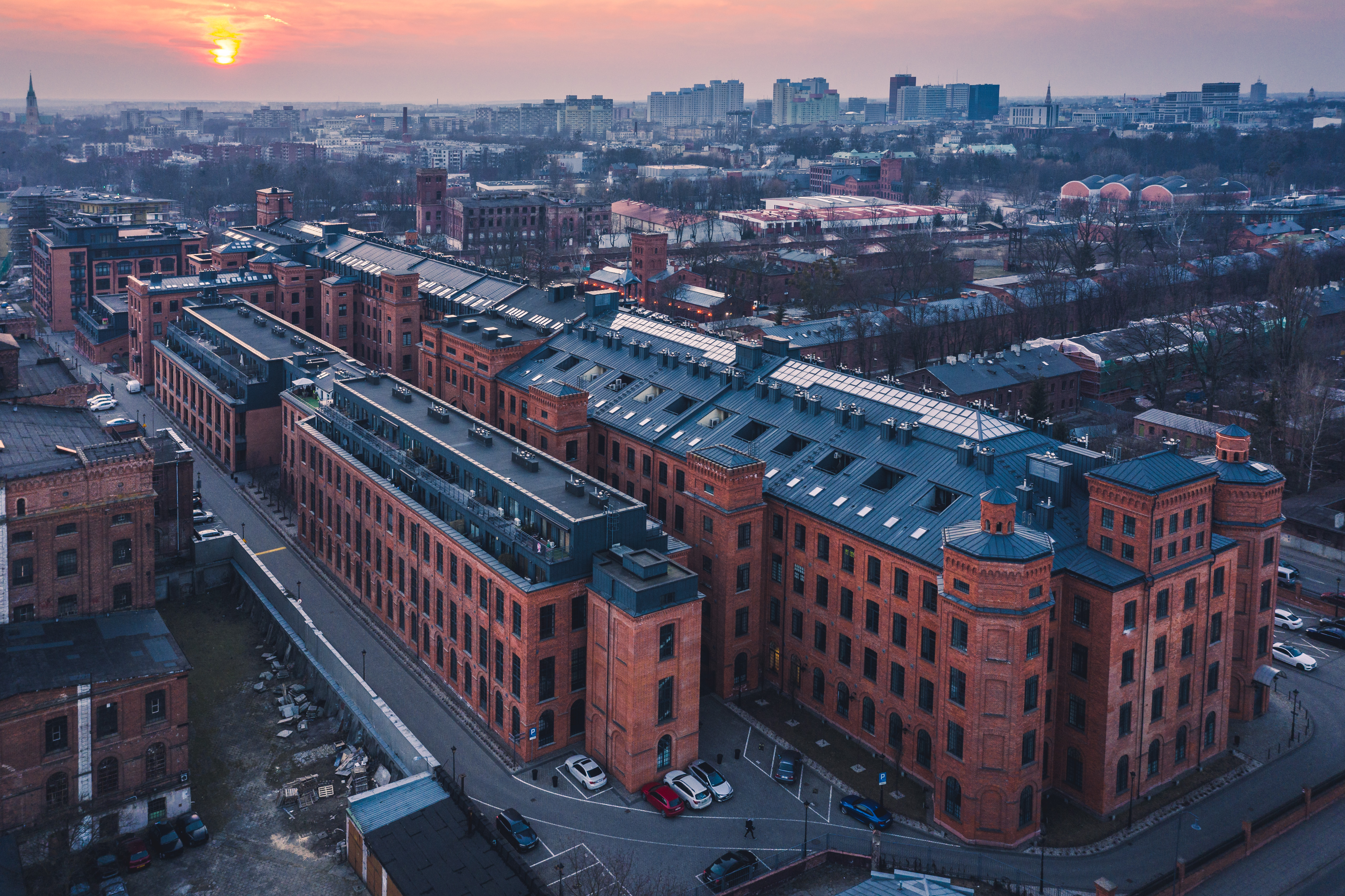
Łódź

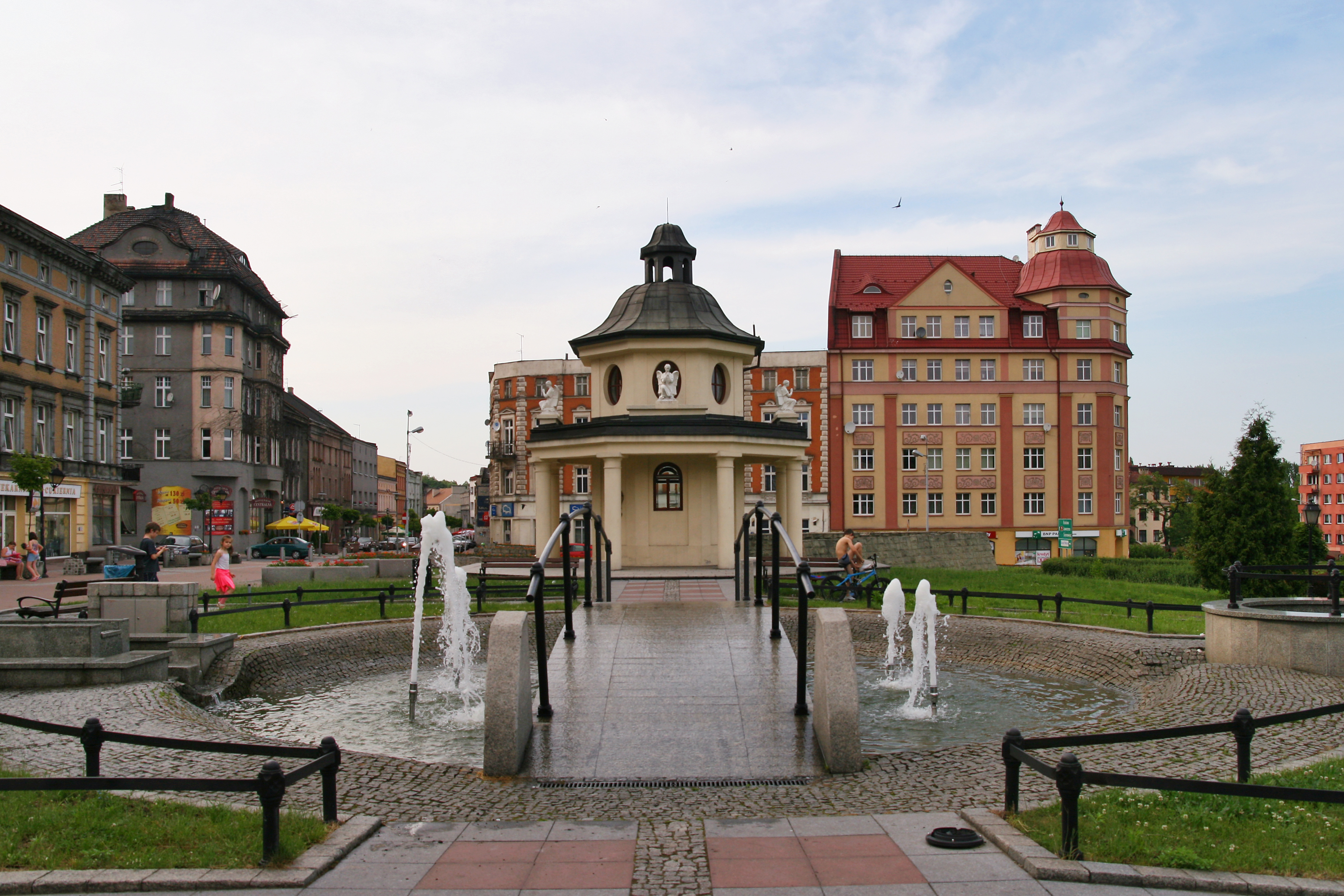
Mysłowice

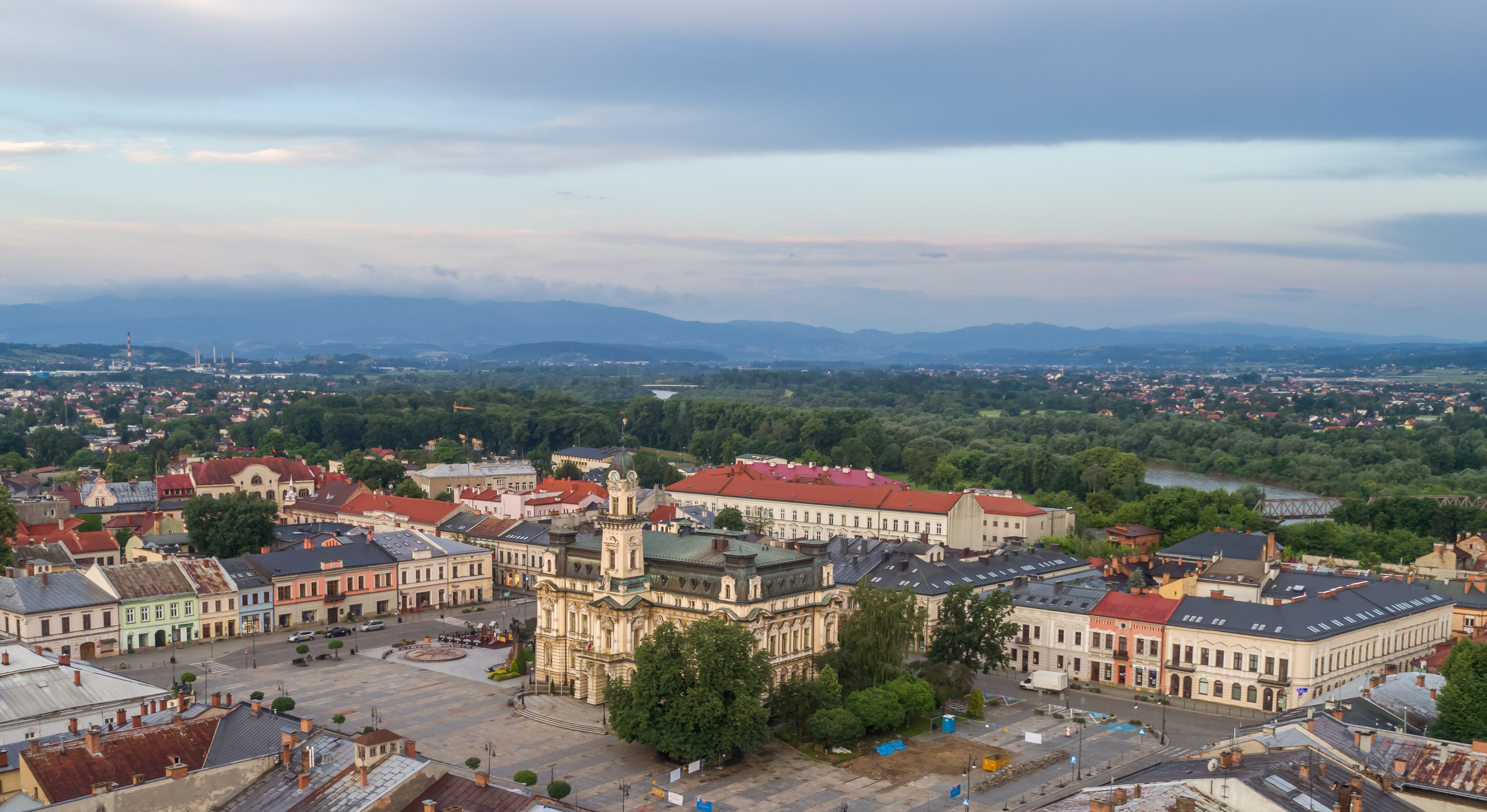
Nowy Sącz

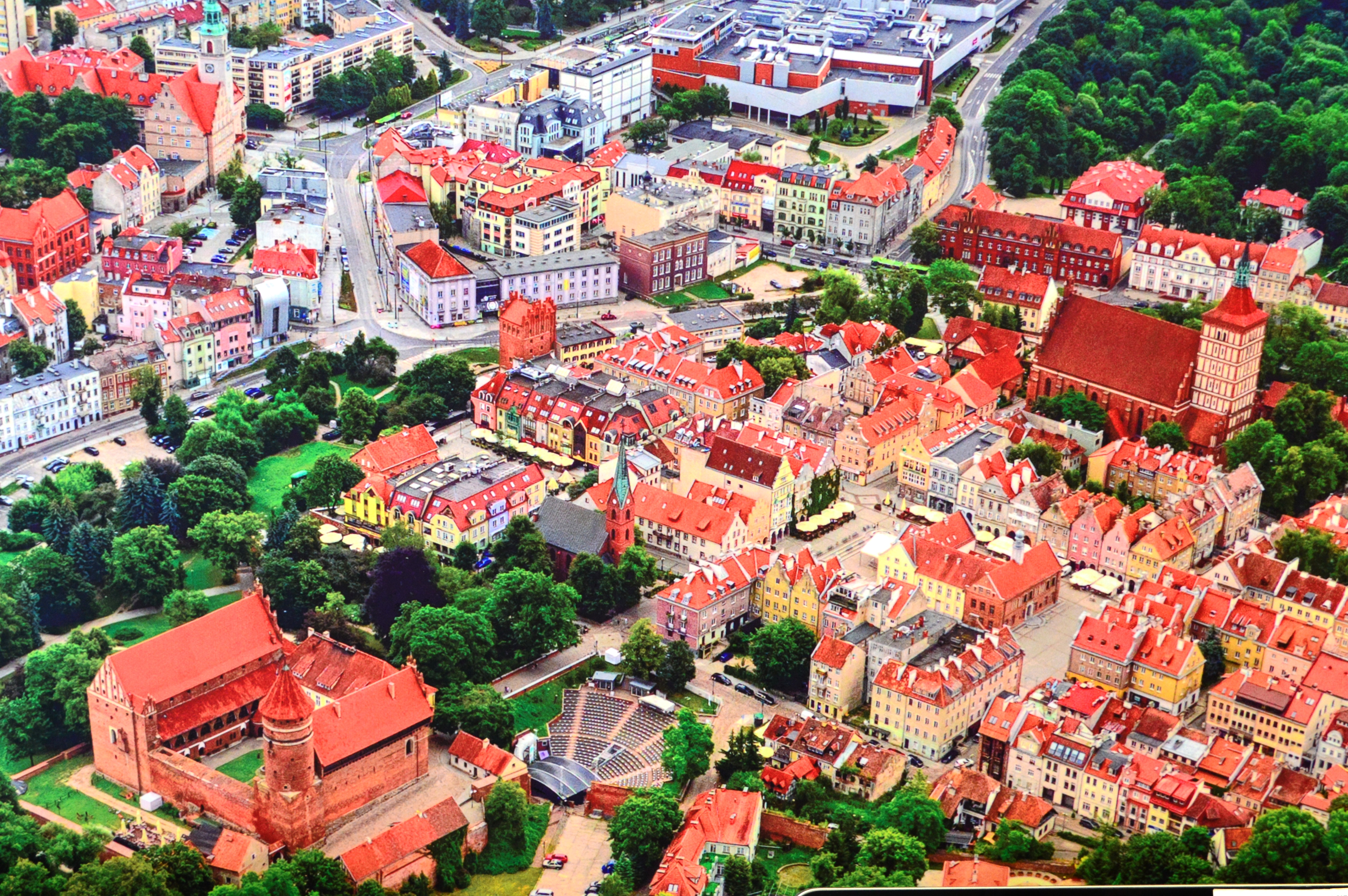
Olsztyn

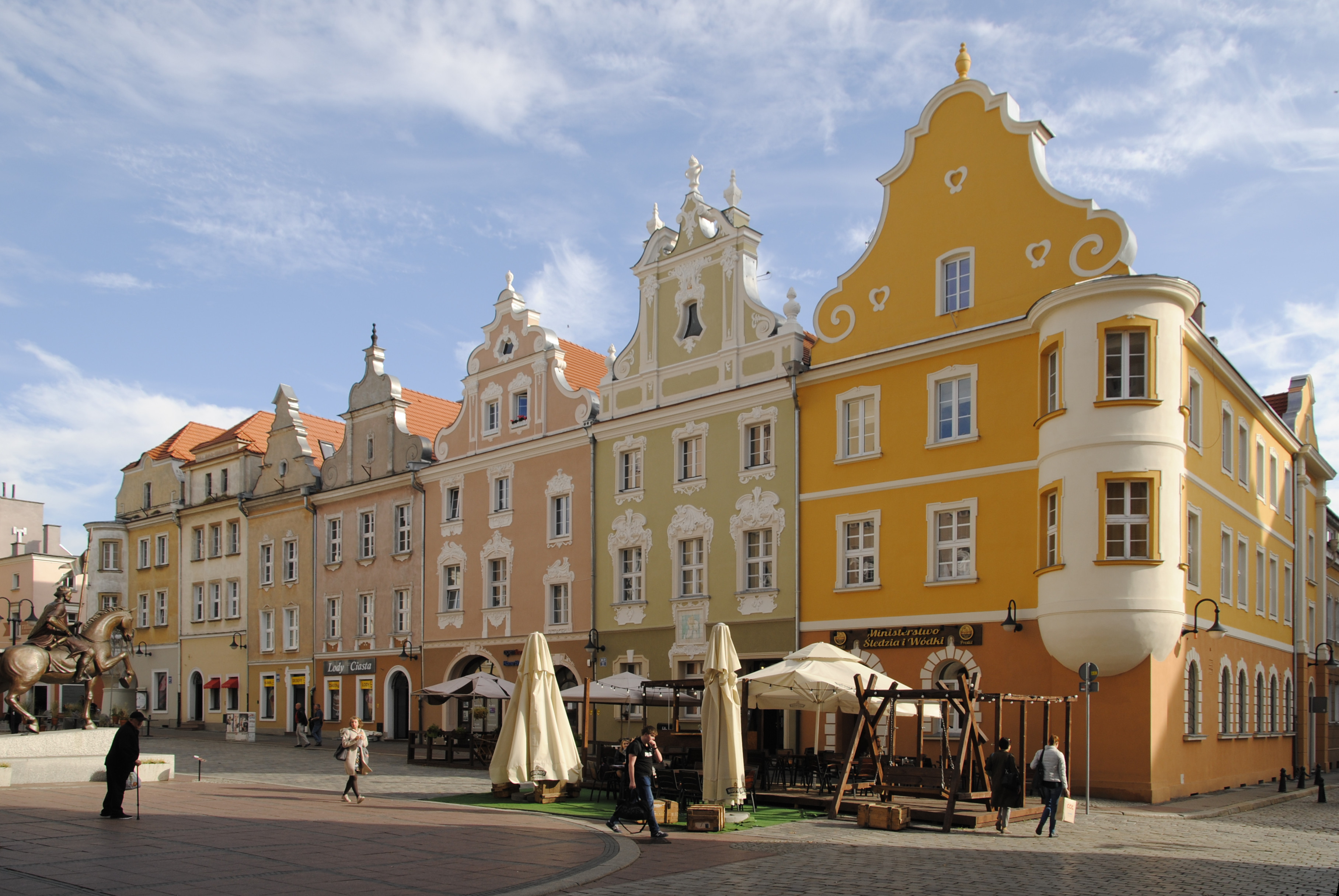
Opole

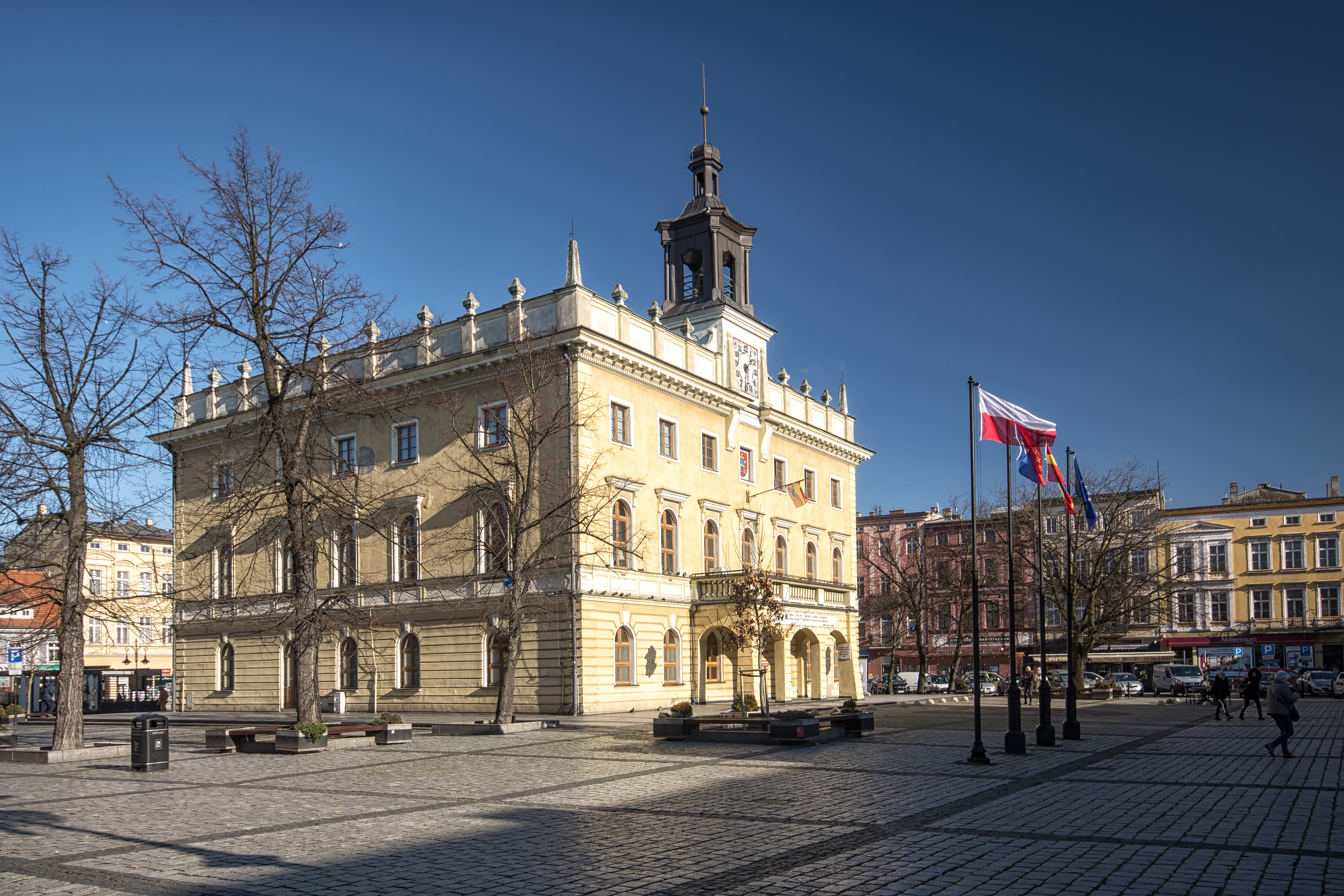
Ostrów Wielkopolski

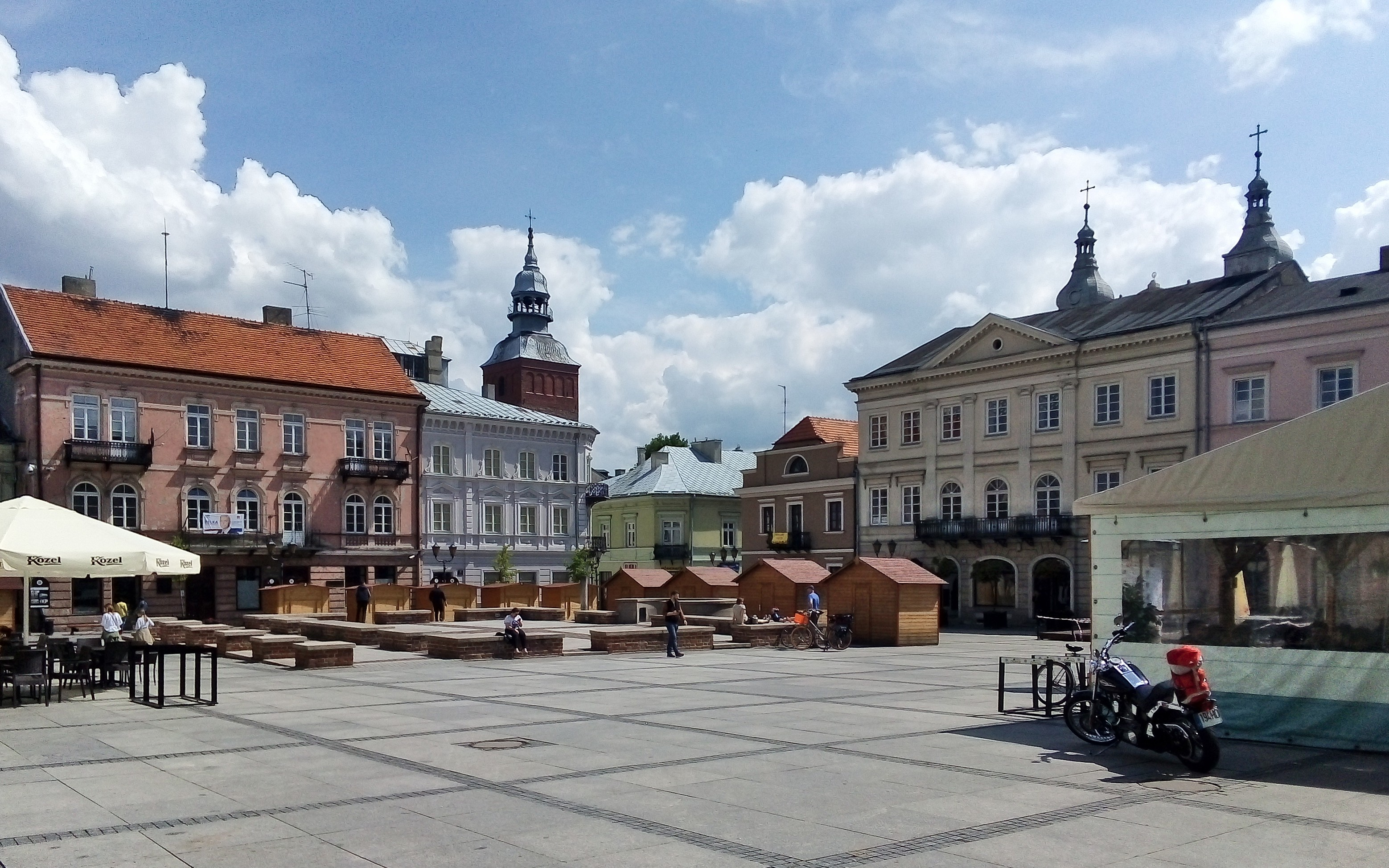
Piotrków Trybunalski

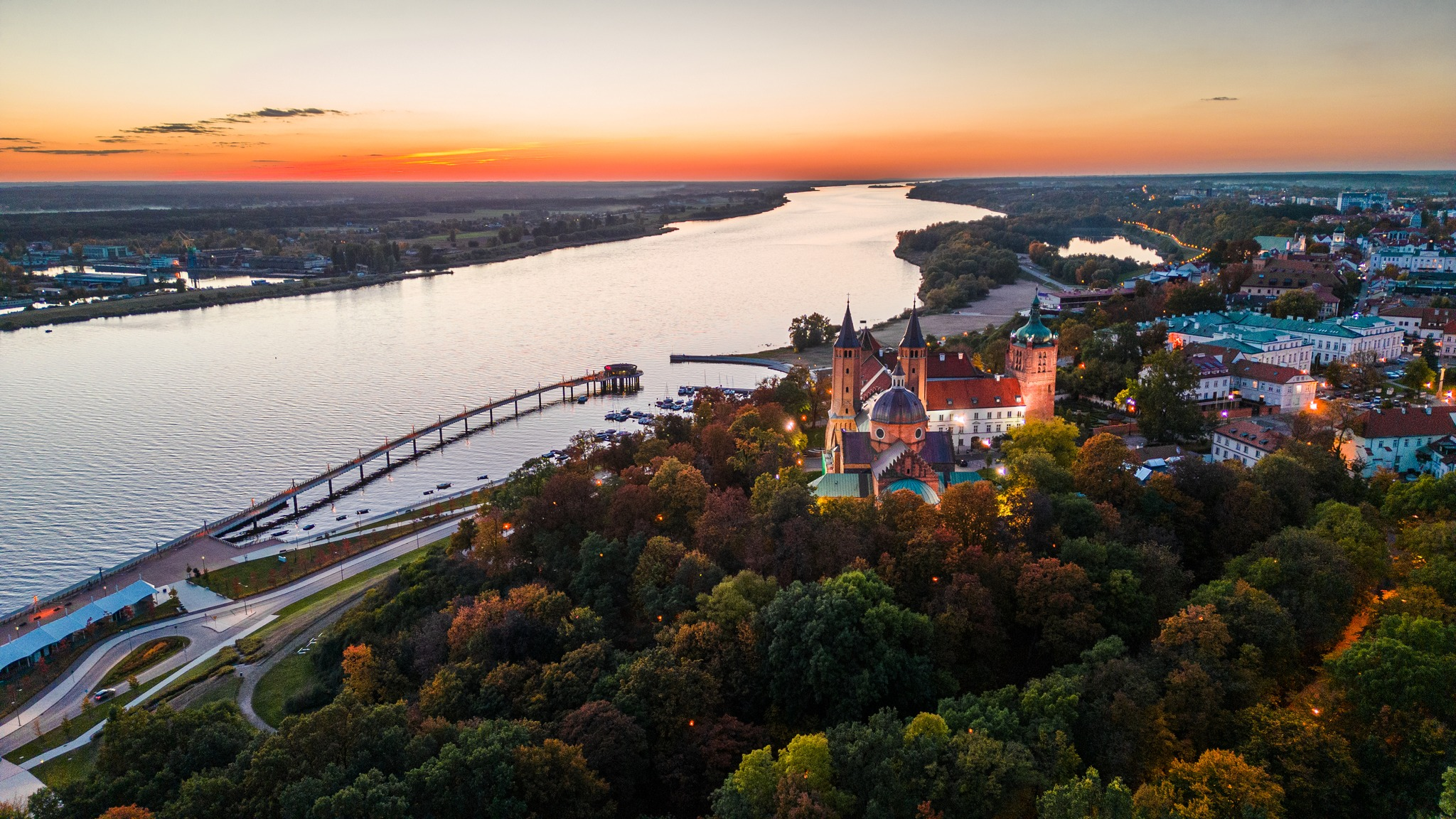
Płock

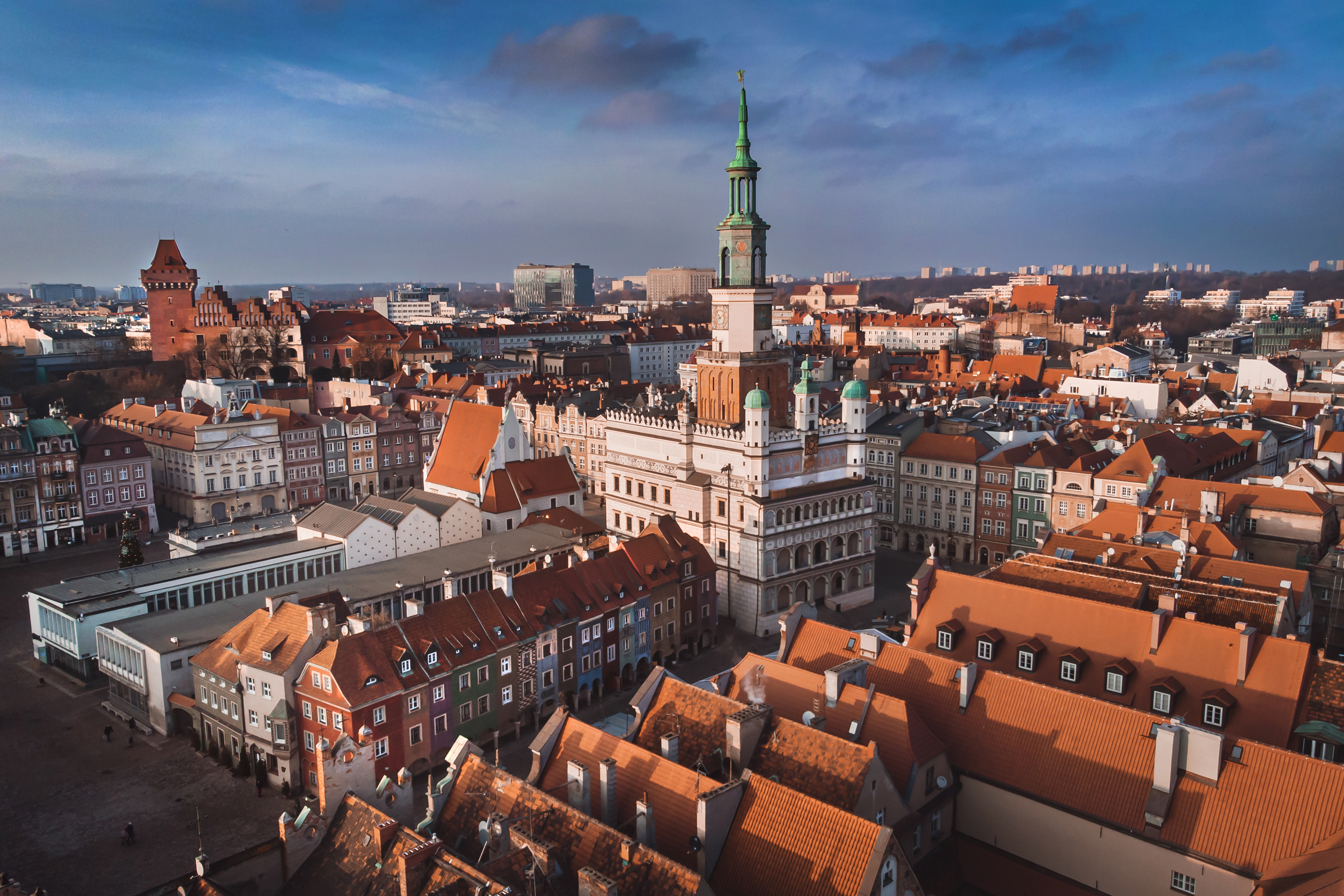
Poznań

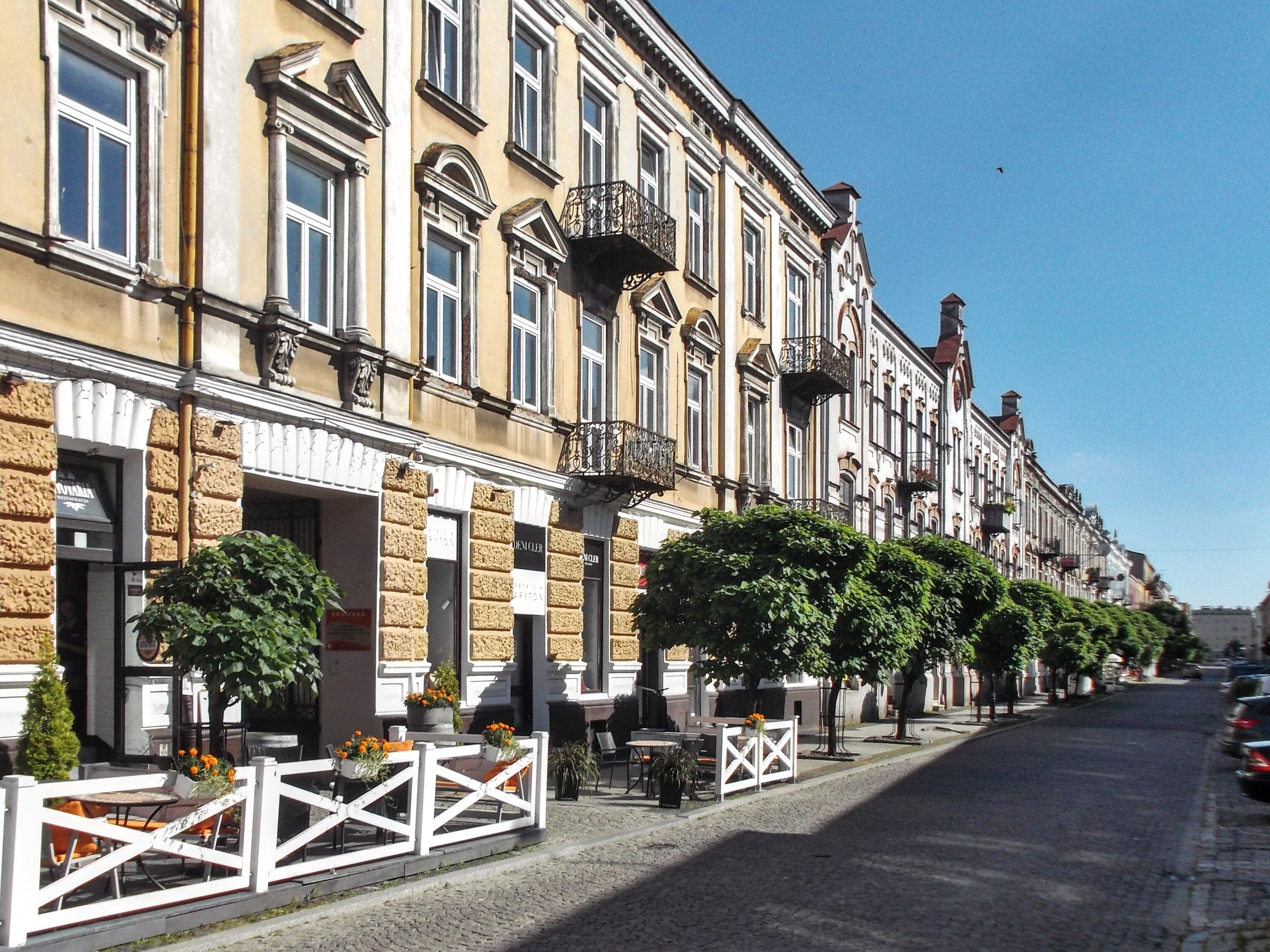
Radom

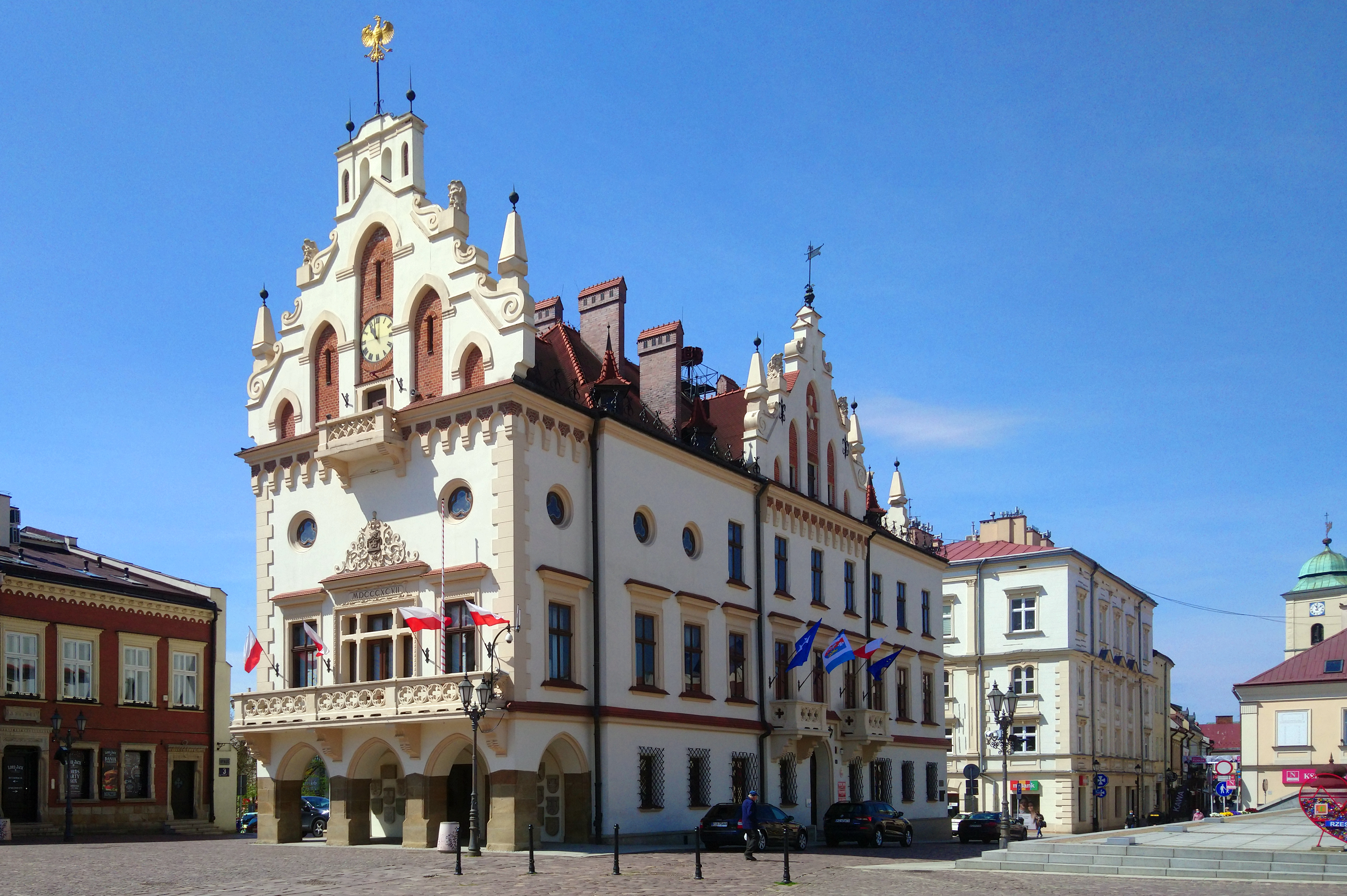
Rzeszów

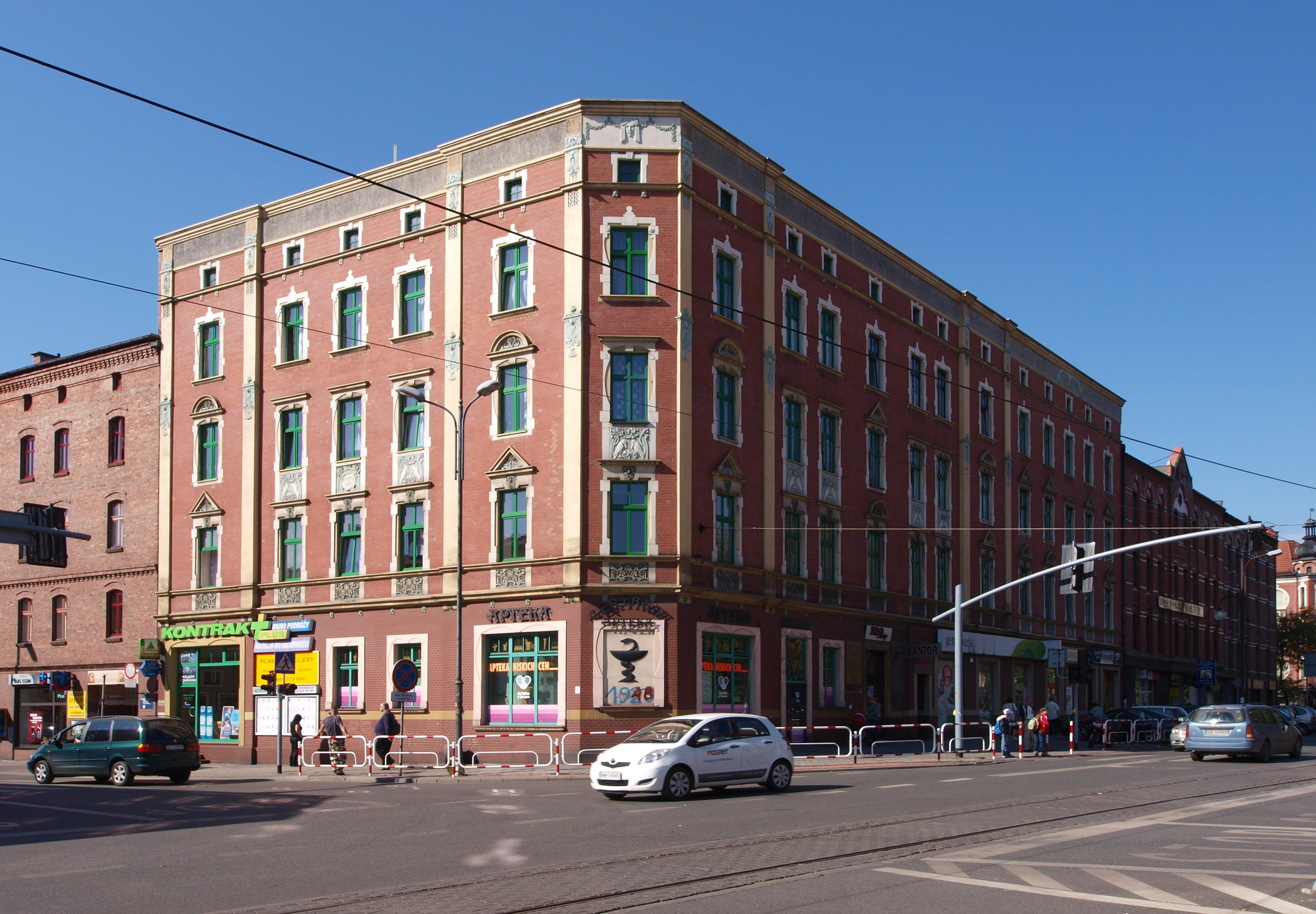
Ruda Śląska

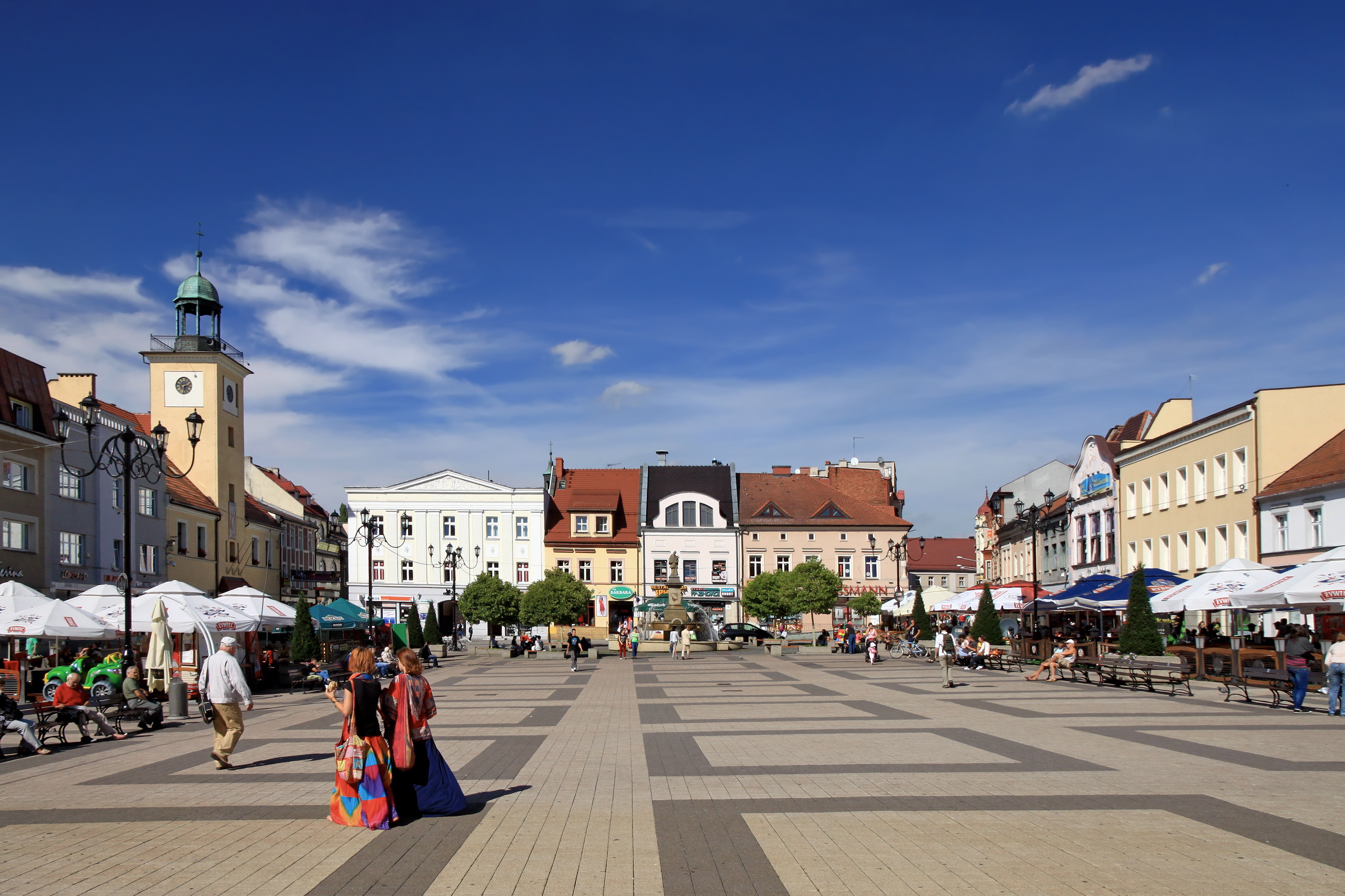
Rybnik

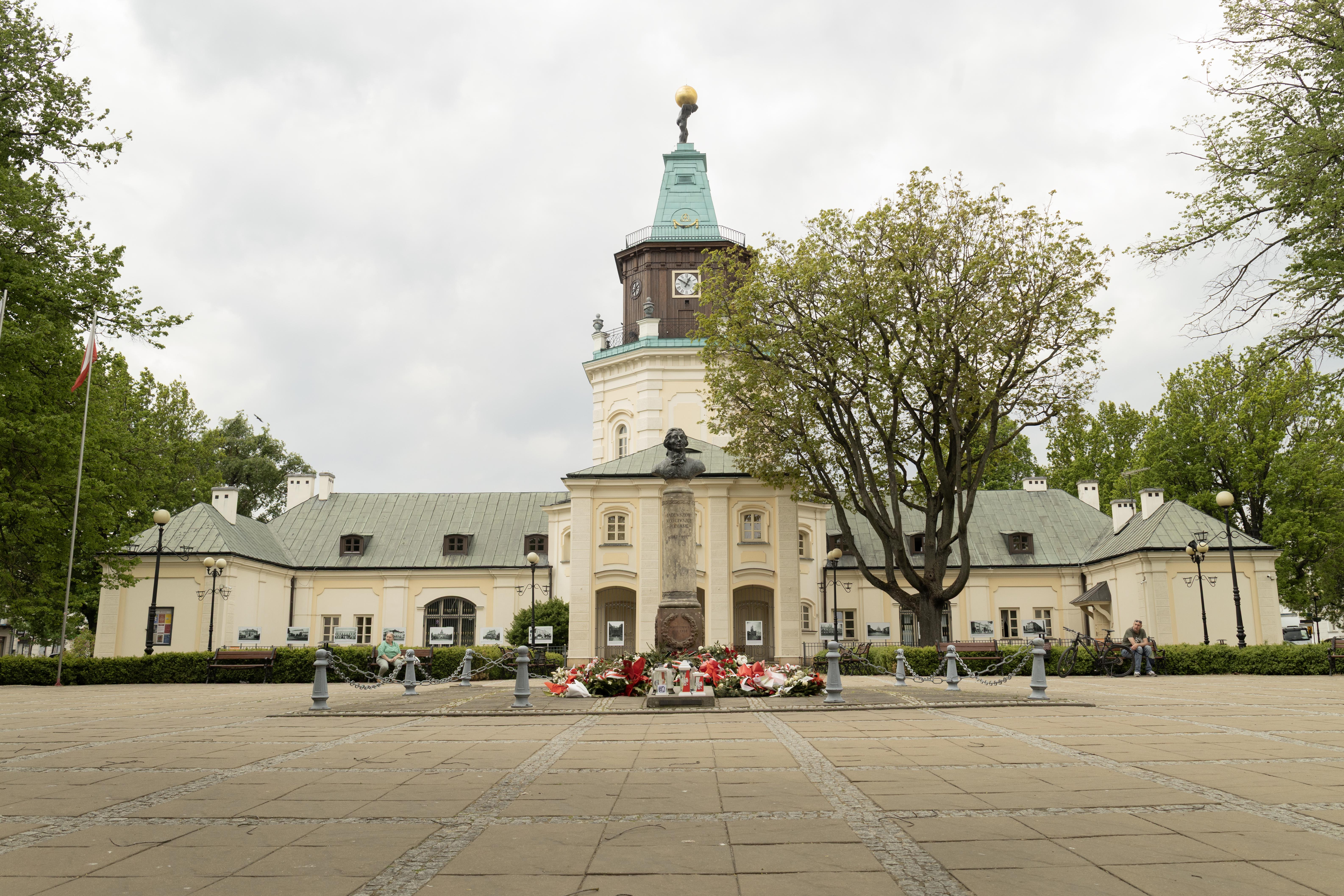
Siedlce

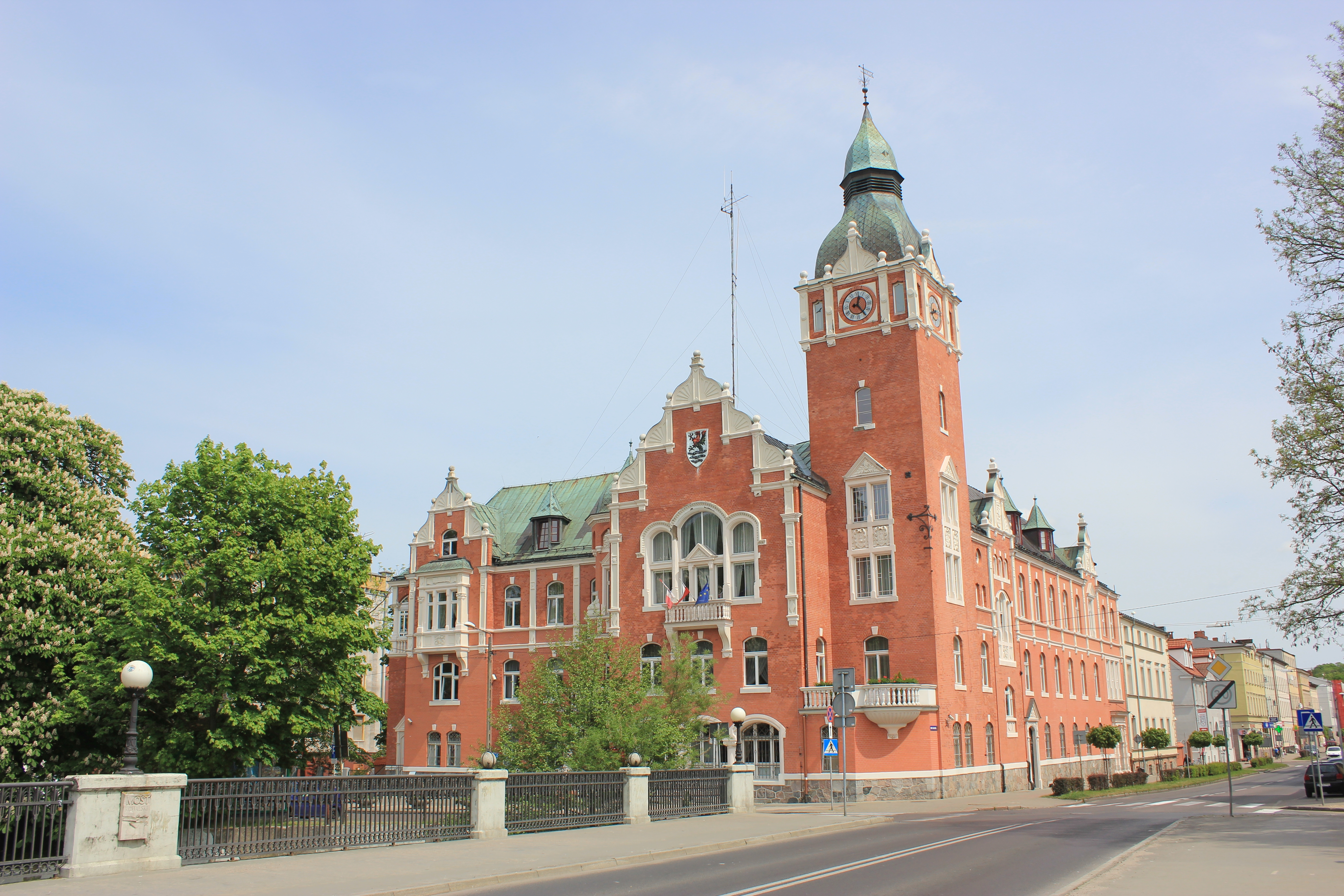
Słupsk

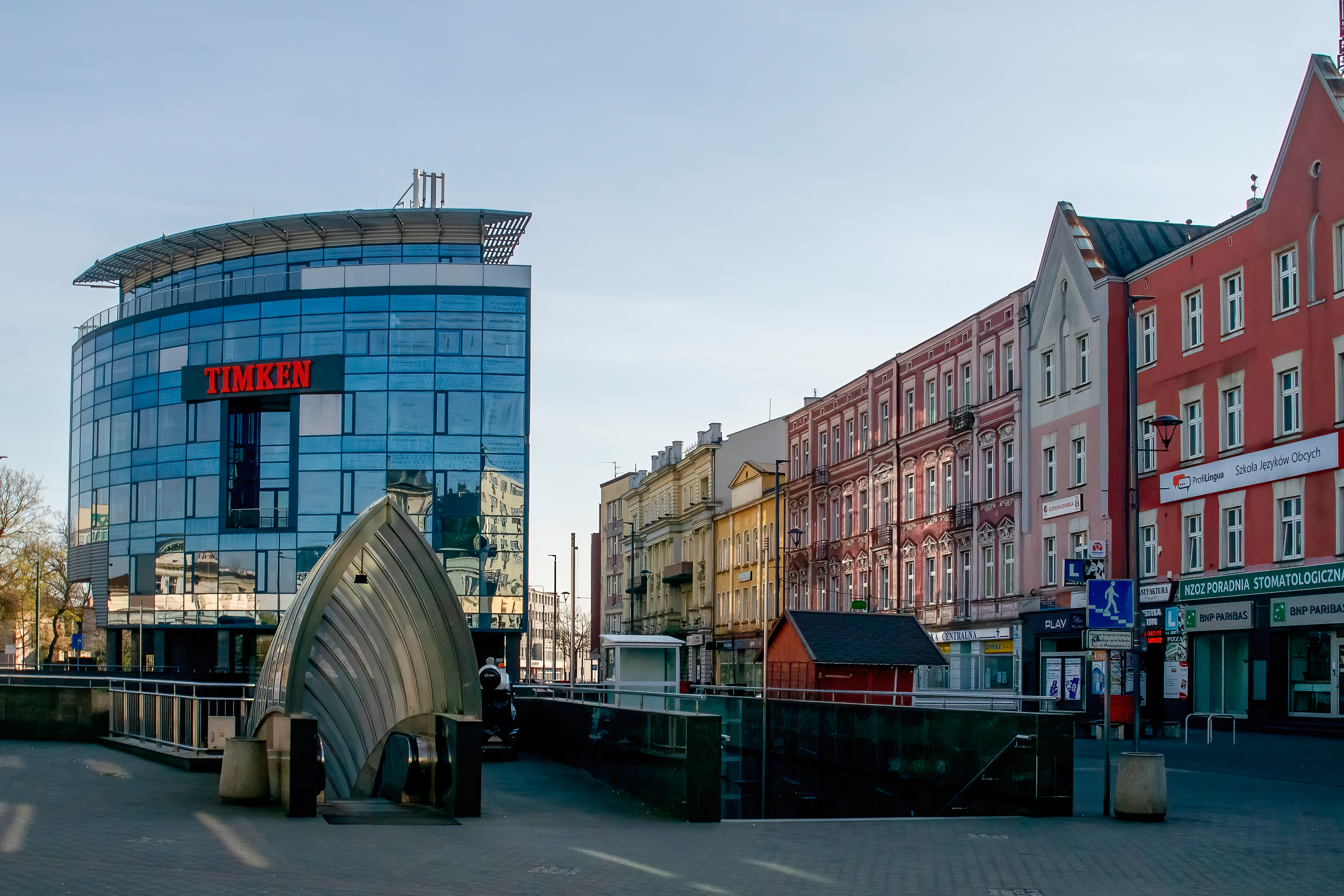
Sosnowiec

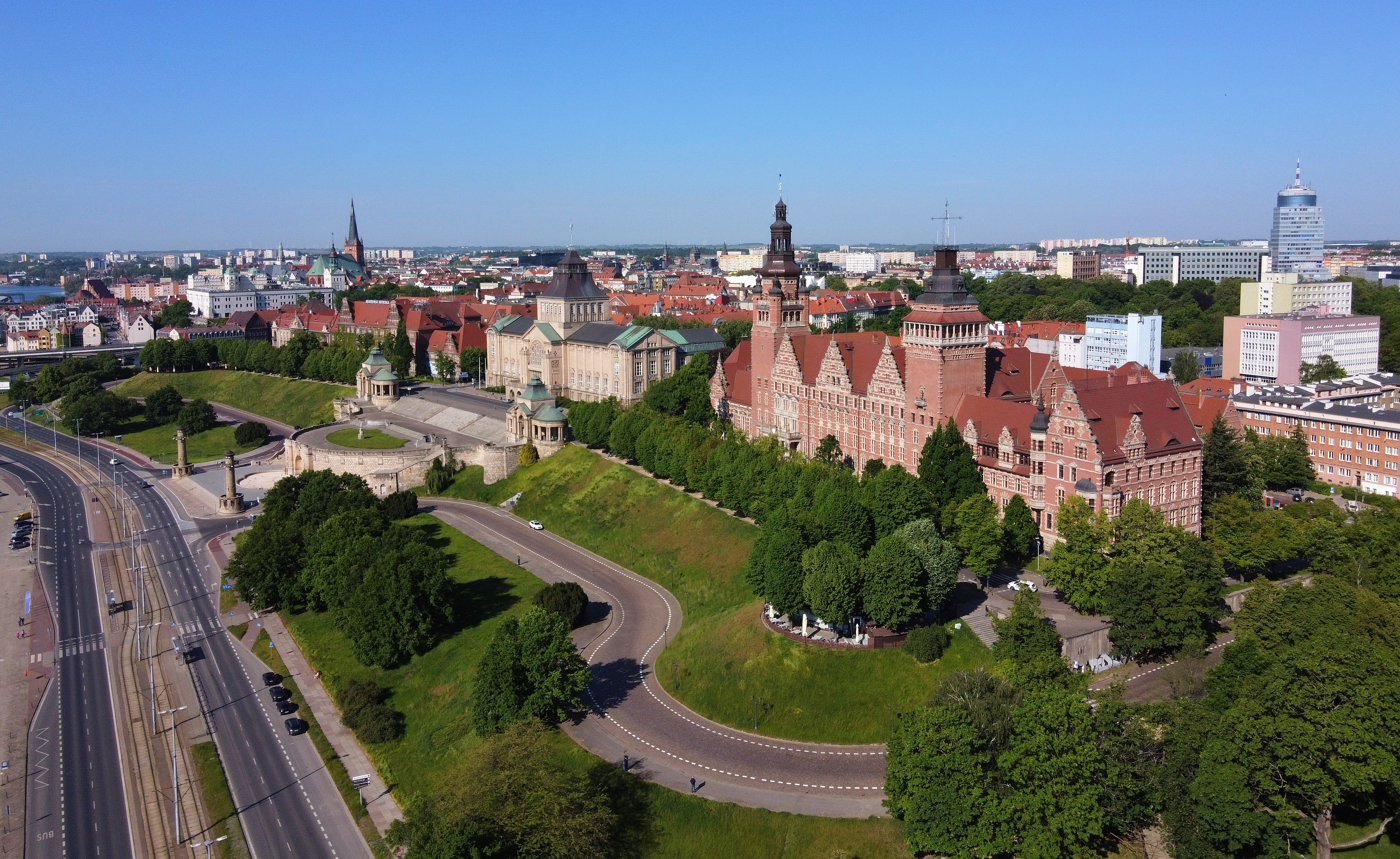
Szczecin

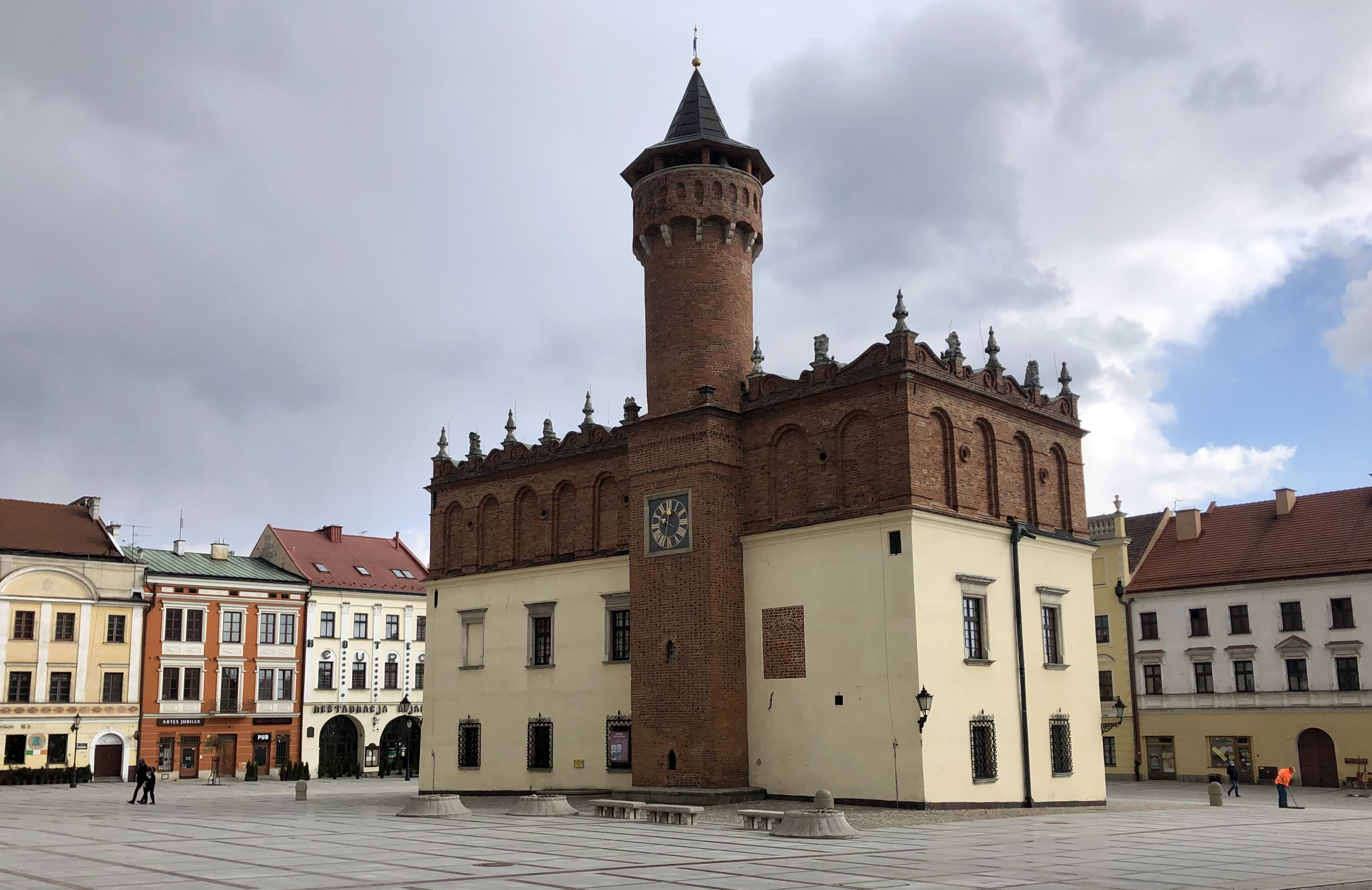
Tarnów

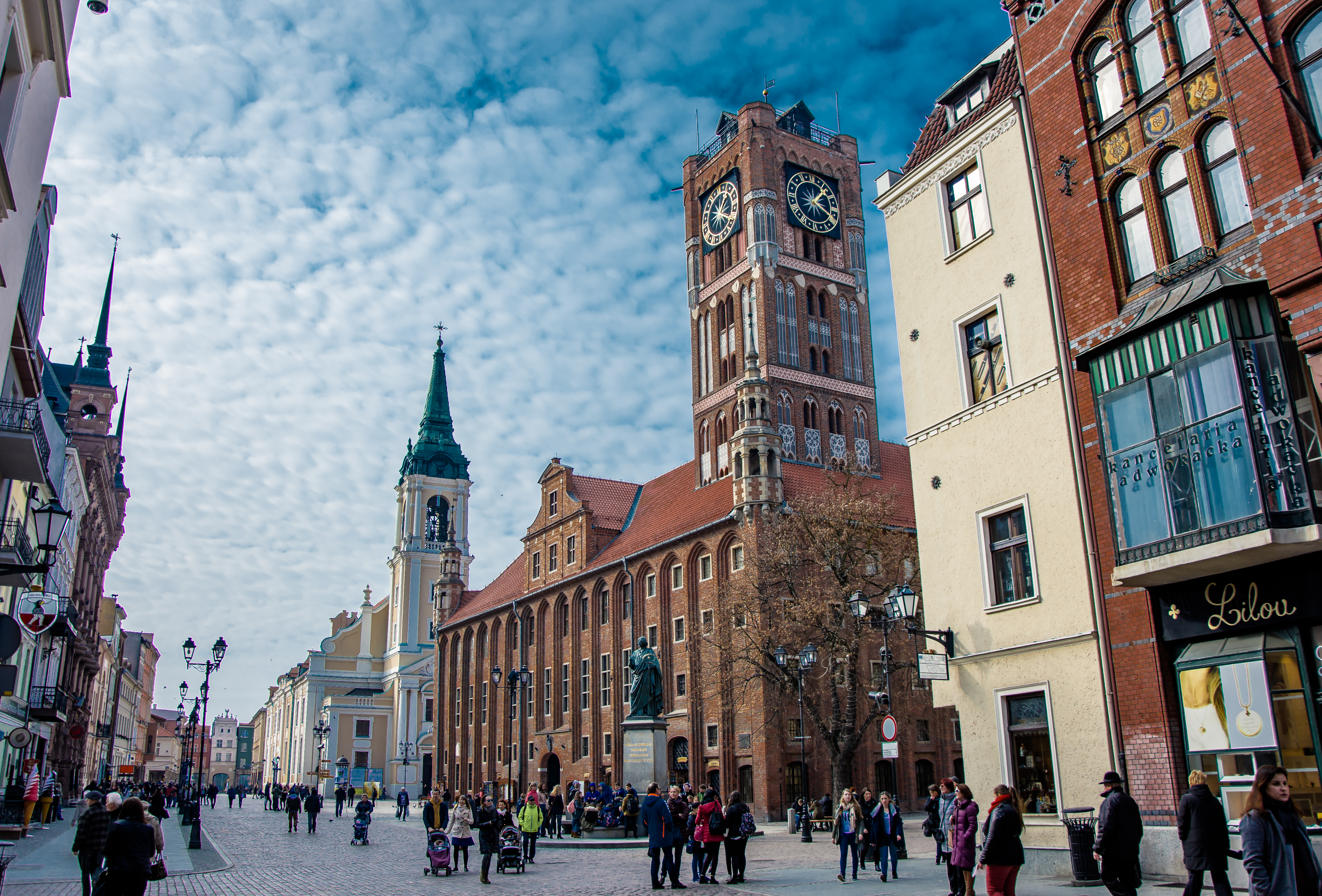
Toruń

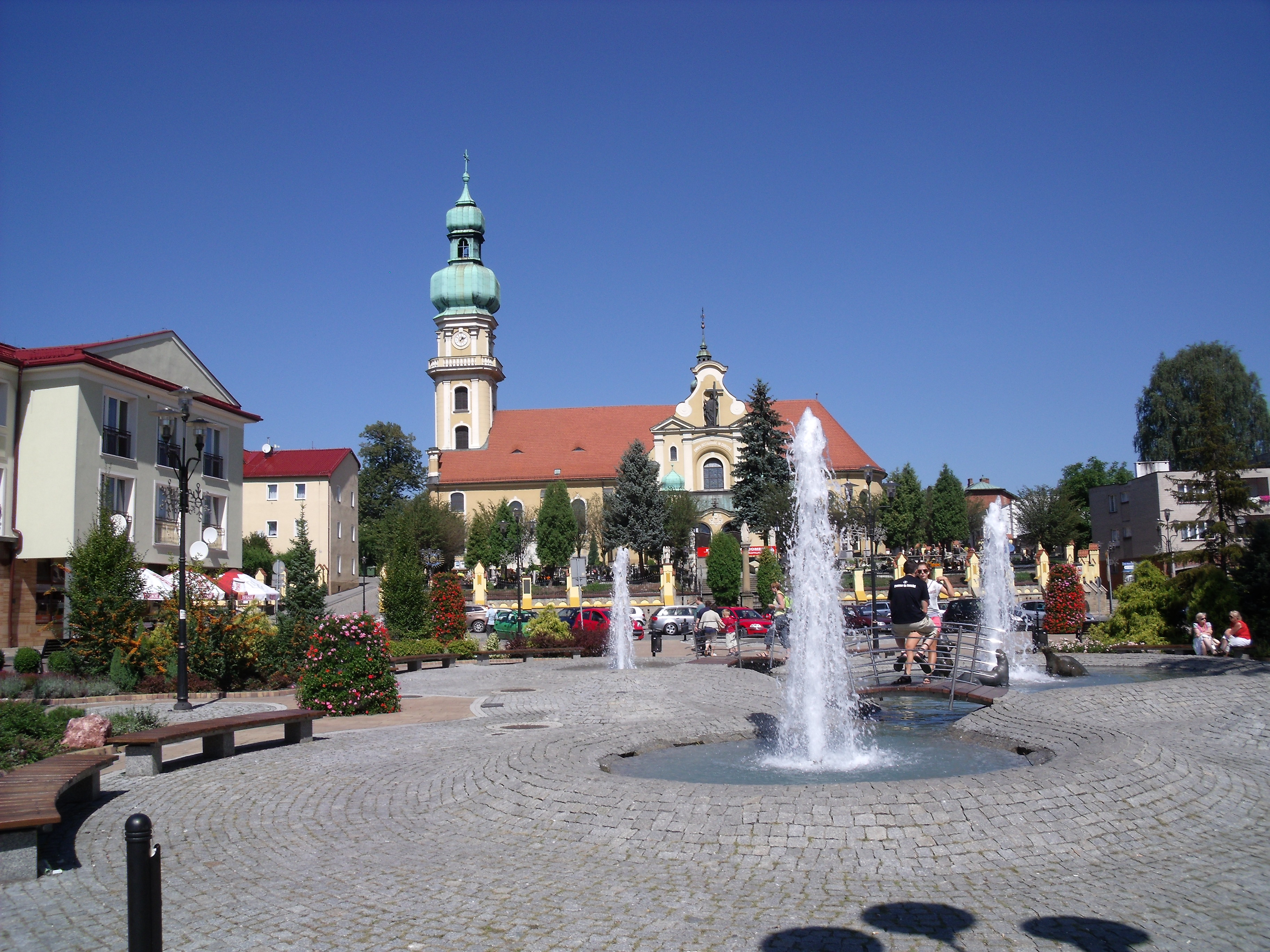
Tychy

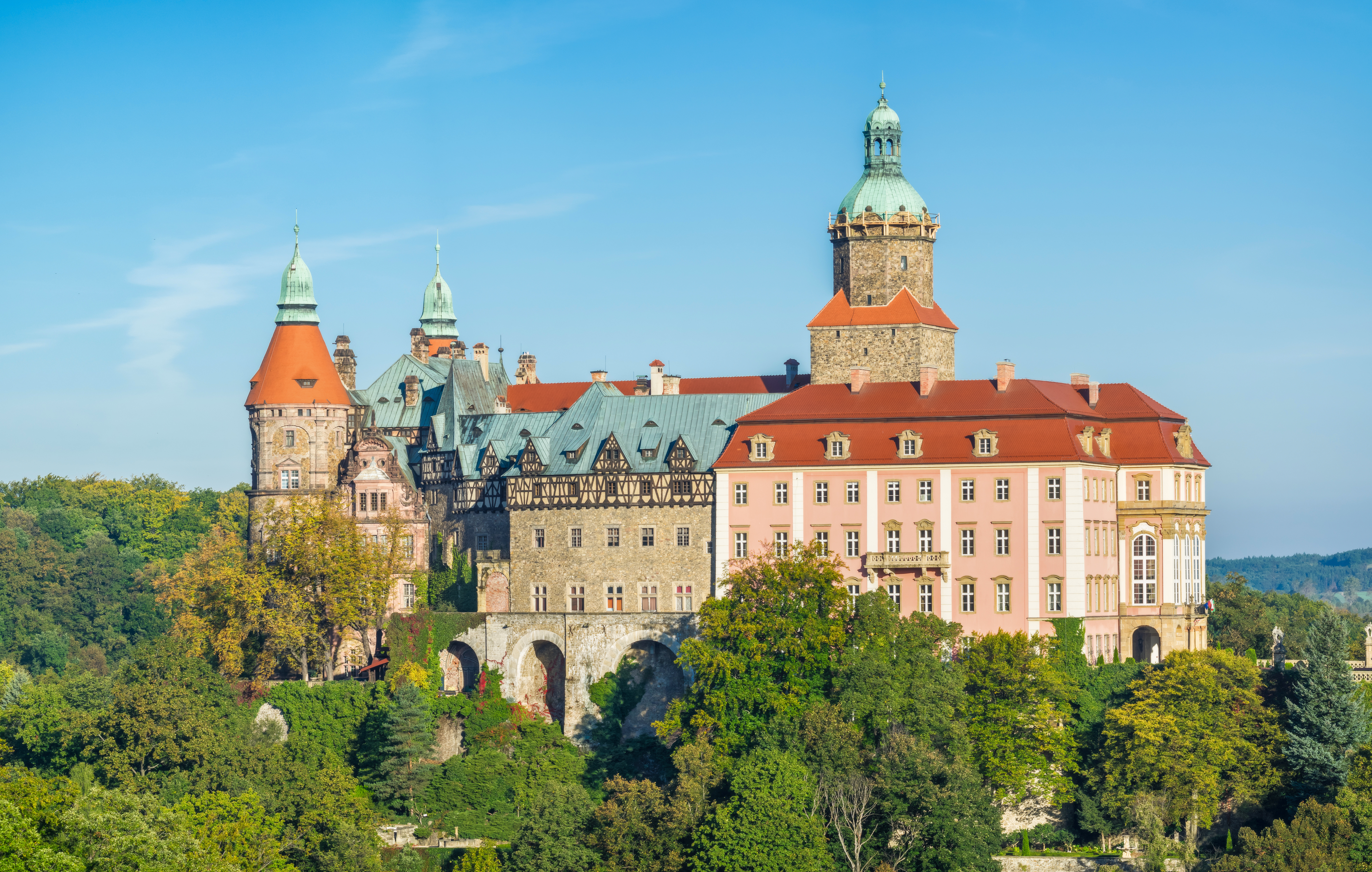
Wałbrzych

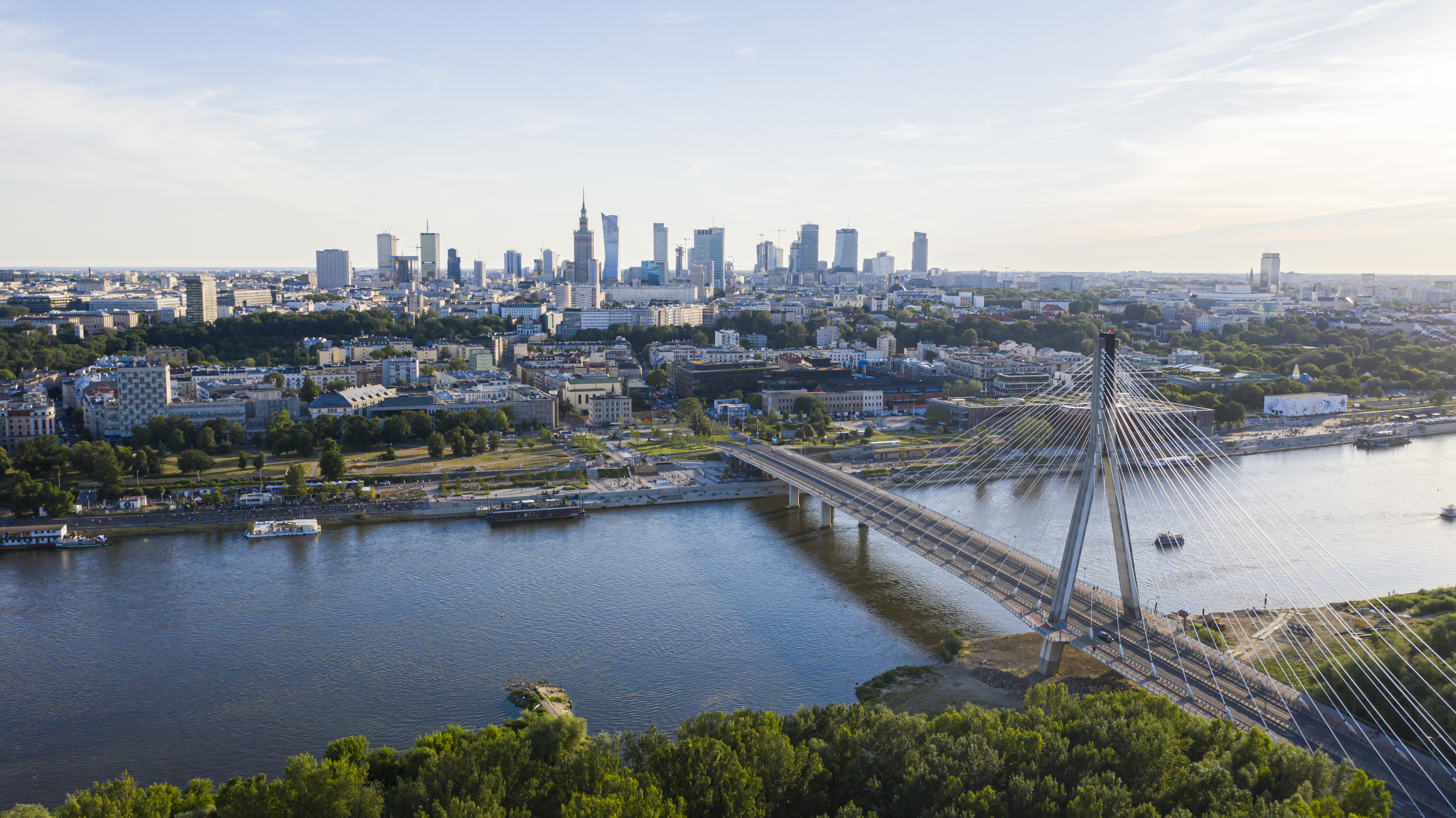
Warsaw

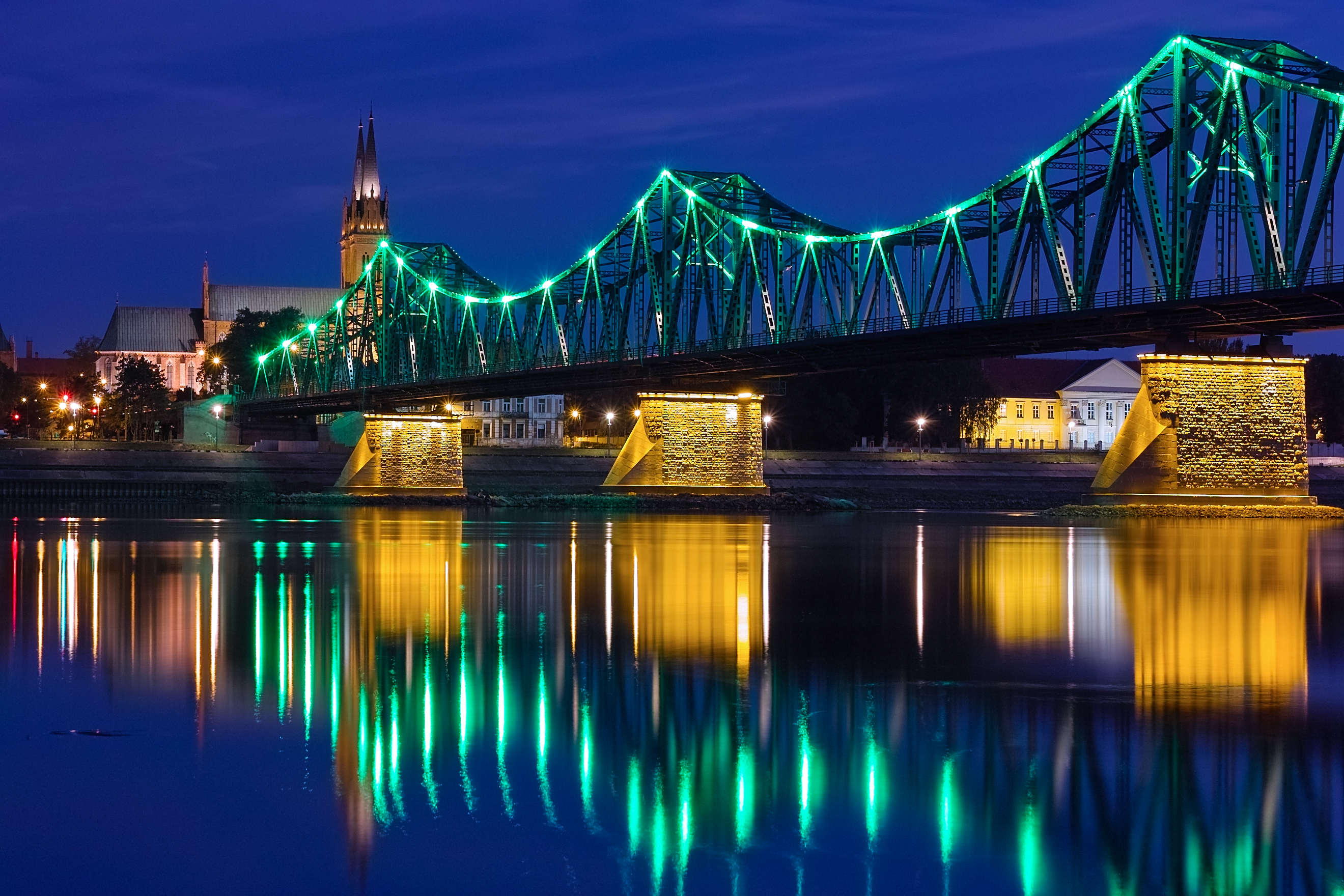
Włocławek

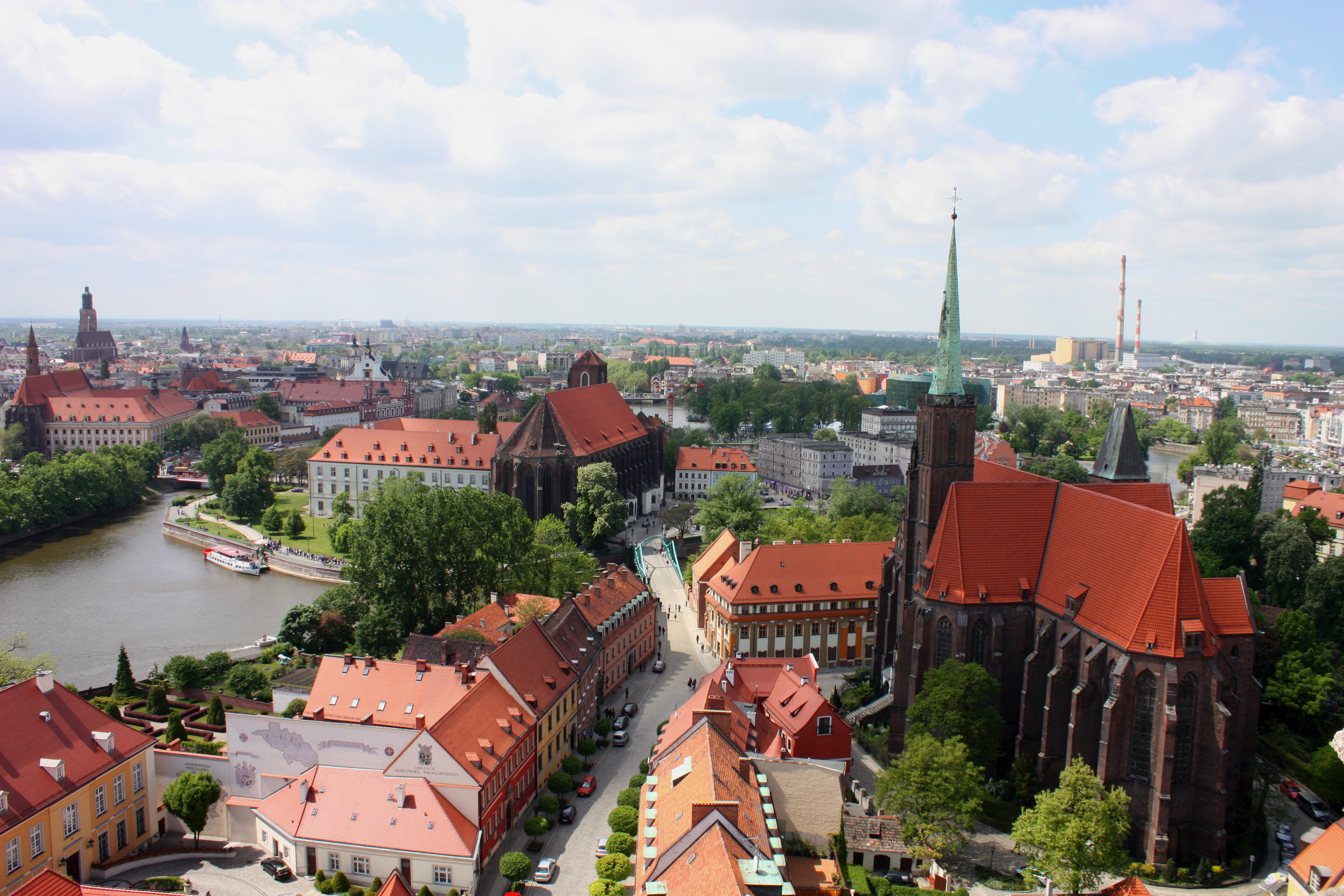
Wrocław

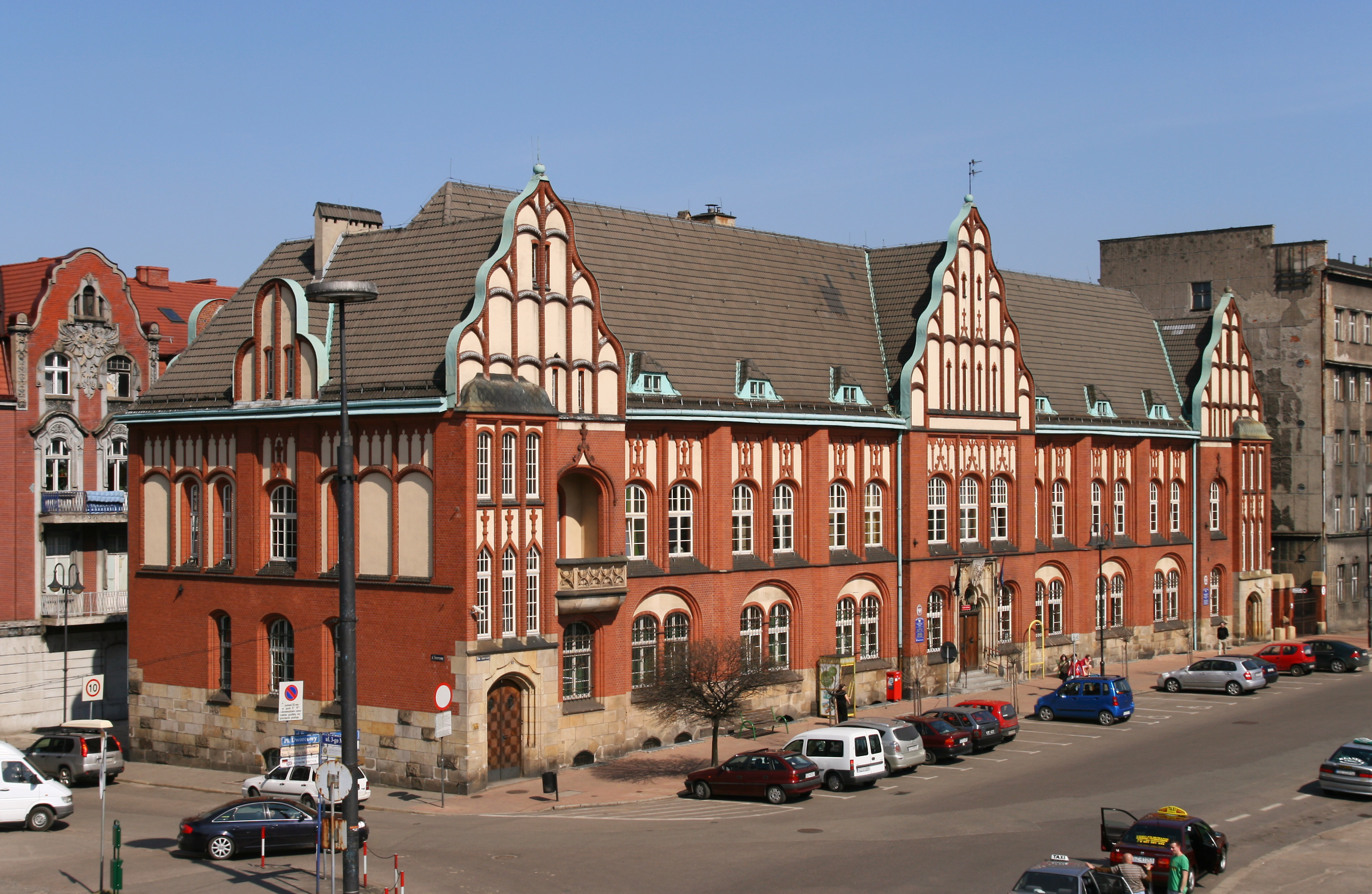
Zabrze

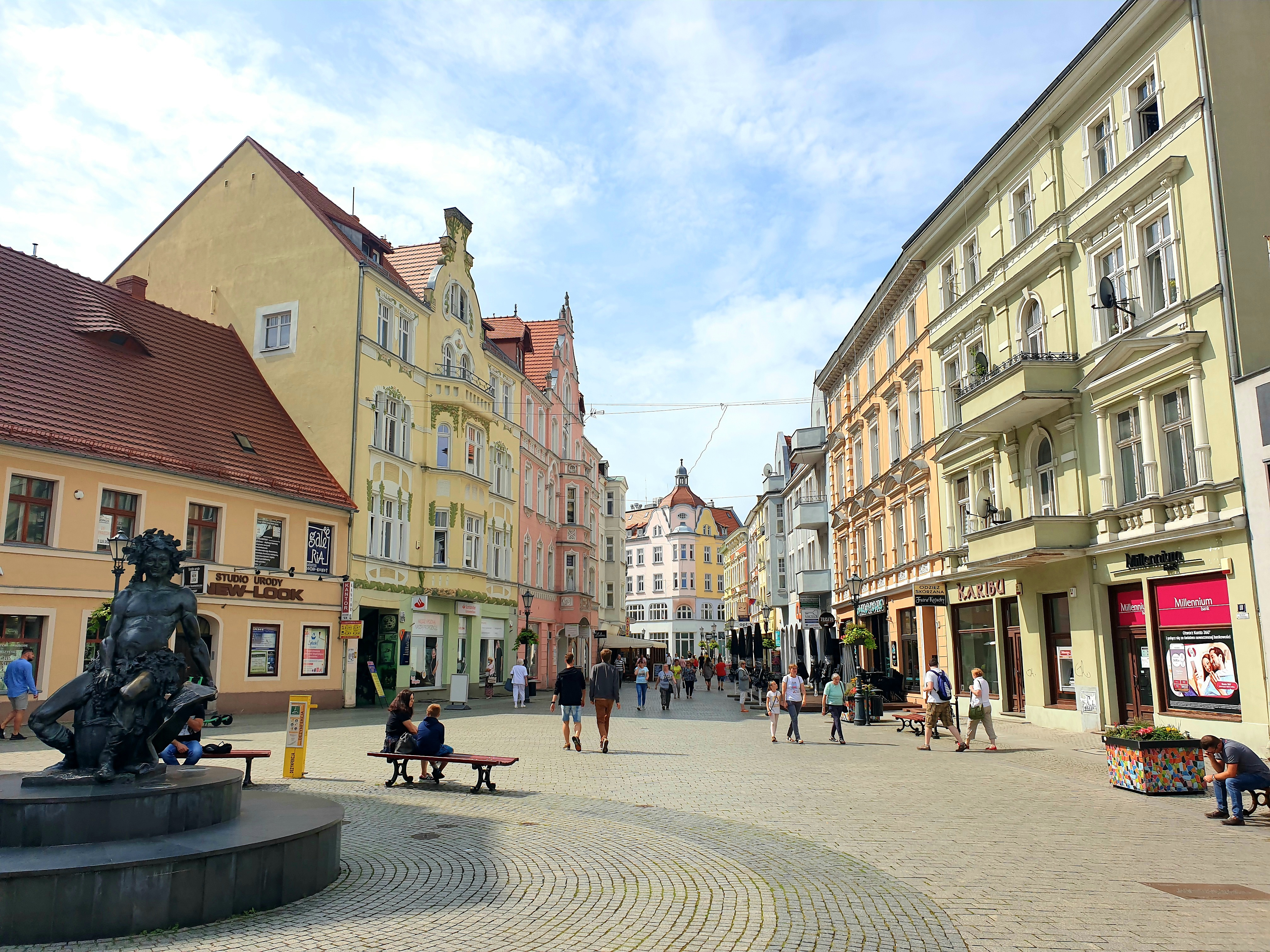
Zielona Góra

=== A ===
- Aleksandrów Kujawski
- Aleksandrów Łódzki
- Alwernia
- Andrychów
- Annopol
- Augustów

=== B ===
==== Ba-Be ====
- Babimost
- Baborów
- Baranów Sandomierski
- Barcin

- Barczewo
- Bardo
- Barlinek
- Bartoszyce

- Barwice
- Bełchatów
- Bełżyce
- Będzin

==== Bi-Bl ====
- Biała
- Biała Piska
- Biała Podlaska
- Biała Rawska
- Białaczów
- Białobrzegi
- Białogard
- Biały Bór
- Białystok

- Biecz
- Bielawa
- Bielsk Podlaski
- Bielsko-Biała
- Bieruń
- Bierutów
- Bieżuń
- Biłgoraj

- Bircza
- Biskupiec
- Bisztynek
- Blachownia
- Błaszki
- Błażowa
- Błonie

==== Bo-Br ====
- Bobolice
- Bobowa
- Bobrowniki
- Bochnia
- Bodzanów
- Bodzentyn
- Bogatynia
- Bogoria
- Boguchwała
- Boguszów-Gorce
- Bojanowo

- Bolesławiec, Lower Silesian Voivodeship
- Bolesławiec, Łódź Voivodeship
- Bolimów
- Bolków
- Borek Wielkopolski
- Borne Sulinowo
- Branice
- Braniewo
- Brańsk
- Brodnica
- Brody

- Brok
- Brusy
- Brwinów
- Brzeg
- Brzeg Dolny
- Brzesko
- Brzeszcze
- Brześć Kujawski
- Brzeziny
- Brzostek
- Brzozów

==== Bu-By ====
- Budzyń
- Buk
- Bukowno
- Busko-Zdrój
- Bychawa
- Byczyna

- Bydgoszcz
- Bystrzyca Kłodzka
- Bytom
- Bytom Odrzański
- Bytów

=== C ===
==== Ce-Ch ====
- Cedynia
- Cegłów
- Chełm
- Chełmek
- Chełmno
- Chełmża
- Chęciny

- Chmielnik
- Chocianów
- Chociwel
- Chocz
- Chodecz
- Chodzież
- Chojna

- Chojnice
- Chojnów
- Choroszcz
- Chorzele
- Chorzów
- Choszczno
- Chrzanów

==== Ci-Cz ====
- Ciechanowiec
- Ciechanów
- Ciechocinek
- Ciepielów
- Cieszanów
- Cieszyn
- Ciężkowice
- Cybinka
- Czaplinek

- Czarna Białostocka
- Czarna Woda
- Czarne
- Czarnków
- Czarny Dunajec
- Czchów
- Czechowice-Dziedzice
- Czeladź
- Czemierniki
- Czempiń

- Czerniejewo
- Czersk
- Czerwieńsk
- Czerwińsk nad Wisłą
- Czerwionka-Leszczyny
- Częstochowa
- Człopa
- Człuchów
- Czyżew

=== Ć ===
- Ćmielów

=== D ===
==== Da-Do ====
- Daleszyce
- Darłowo
- Dąbie
- Dąbrowa Białostocka
- Dąbrowa Górnicza
- Dąbrowa Tarnowska
- Dąbrowice
- Debrzno

- Dębica
- Dęblin
- Dębno
- Dobczyce
- Dobiegniew
- Dobra, Łobez County
- Dobra, Turek County

- Dobre
- Dobre Miasto
- Dobrodzień
- Dobrzany
- Dobrzyca
- Dobrzyń nad Wisłą
- Dolsk

==== Dr-Dz ====
- Drawno
- Drawsko Pomorskie
- Drezdenko
- Drobin
- Drohiczyn
- Drzewica

- Dubiecko
- Dukla
- Duszniki-Zdrój
- Dynów
- Działdowo

- Działoszyce
- Działoszyn
- Dzierzgoń
- Dzierżoniów
- Dziwnów

=== E ===
- Elbląg
- Ełk

=== F ===
- Frampol
- Frombork

=== G ===
==== Ga-Gn ====
- Garwolin
- Gąbin
- Gąsawa
- Gdańsk
- Gdynia
- Gielniów
- Giżycko

- Glinojeck
- Gliwice
- Głogów
- Głogów Małopolski
- Głogówek
- Głowaczów
- Głowno

- Głubczyce
- Głuchołazy
- Głuszyca
- Gniew
- Gniewkowo
- Gniezno

==== Go - Gó ====
- Gogolin
- Golczewo
- Goleniów
- Golina
- Golub-Dobrzyń
- Gołańcz
- Gołdap

- Goniądz
- Goraj
- Gorlice
- Gorzów Śląski
- Gorzów Wielkopolski
- Gościno
- Gostynin

- Gostyń
- Gowarczów
- Gozdnica
- Góra
- Góra Kalwaria
- Górowo Iławeckie
- Górzno

==== Gr-Gu ====
- Grabów
- Grabów nad Prosną
- Grajewo
- Grodków
- Grodzisk Mazowiecki

- Grodzisk Wielkopolski
- Grójec
- Grudziądz
- Grybów

- Gryfice
- Gryfino
- Gryfów Śląski
- Gubin

=== H ===
- Hajnówka
- Halinów
- Hel
- Hrubieszów

=== I ===
- Iława
- Iłowa
- Iłża
- Imielin
- Inowłódz
- Inowrocław

- Ińsko
- Iwaniska
- Iwonicz-Zdrój
- Izbica
- Izbica Kujawska

=== J ===
- Jabłonowo Pomorskie
- Jadów
- Janikowo
- Janowiec Wielkopolski
- Janów
- Janów Lubelski
- Janów Podlaski
- Jaraczewo
- Jarocin
- Jarosław
- Jasień
- Jasło

- Jastarnia
- Jastrowie
- Jastrząb
- Jastrzębie-Zdrój
- Jawor
- Jawornik Polski
- Jaworzno
- Jaworzyna Śląska
- Jedlicze
- Jedlina-Zdrój
- Jedlnia-Letnisko

- Jedwabne
- Jelcz-Laskowice
- Jelenia Góra
- Jeziorany
- Jeżów
- Jędrzejów
- Jordanów
- Józefów
- Józefów (Biłgoraj County)
- Józefów nad Wisłą
- Jutrosin

=== K ===
==== Ka-Kc ====
- Kaczory
- Kalety
- Kalisz
- Kalisz Pomorski
- Kalwaria Zebrzydowska
- Kałuszyn
- Kamieniec Ząbkowicki
- Kamienna Góra

- Kamień Krajeński
- Kamień Pomorski
- Kamieńsk
- Kamionka
- Kańczuga
- Karczew
- Kargowa
- Karlino

- Karpacz
- Kartuzy
- Katowice
- Kazanów
- Kazimierz Dolny
- Kazimierza Wielka
- Kąty Wrocławskie
- Kcynia

==== Ke-Kn ====
- Kędzierzyn-Koźle
- Kępice
- Kępno
- Kętrzyn
- Kęty
- Kielce
- Kiernozia

- Kietrz
- Kikół
- Kisielice
- Kleczew
- Kleszczele
- Klimontów
- Kluczbork

- Kłecko
- Kłobuck
- Kłodawa
- Kłodzko
- Knurów
- Knyszyn

==== Ko ====
- Kobylin
- Kobylnica
- Kobyłka
- Kock
- Kolbuszowa
- Kolno
- Kolonowskie
- Koluszki
- Kołaczyce
- Koło
- Kołobrzeg
- Koniecpol

- Konin
- Konstancin-Jeziorna
- Konstantynów Łódzki
- Końskie
- Końskowola
- Koprzywnica
- Korfantów
- Koronowo
- Korsze
- Kosów Lacki
- Kostrzyn
- Kostrzyn nad Odrą

- Koszalin
- Koszyce
- Kościan
- Kościerzyna
- Kowal
- Kowalewo Pomorskie
- Kowary
- Koziegłowy
- Kozienice
- Koźmin Wielkopolski
- Koźminek
- Kożuchów
- Kórnik

==== Kr-Kw ====
- Krajenka
- Kraków
- Krapkowice
- Krasnobród
- Krasnystaw
- Kraśnik
- Krobia
- Krosno
- Krosno Odrzańskie

- Krośniewice
- Krotoszyn
- Kruszwica
- Krynica
- Krynica Morska
- Krynki
- Krzanowice
- Krzepice
- Krzeszowice

- Krzywiń
- Krzyż Wielkopolski
- Książ Wielki
- Książ Wielkopolski
- Kudowa-Zdrój
- Kunów
- Kurów
- Kutno
- Kuźnia Raciborska
- Kwidzyn

=== L ===
==== La-Li ====
- Latowicz
- Lądek-Zdrój
- Legionowo
- Legnica
- Lesko
- Leszno
- Leśna

- Leśnica
- Lewin Brzeski
- Leżajsk
- Lębork
- Lędziny
- Libiąż
- Lidzbark

- Lidzbark Warmiński
- Limanowa
- Lipiany
- Lipno
- Lipsk
- Lipsko

==== Lu-Lw ====
- Lubaczów
- Lubań
- Lubartów
- Lubawa
- Lubawka
- Lubień Kujawski
- Lubin

- Lublin
- Lubliniec
- Lubniewice
- Lubomierz
- Luboń
- Lubowidz
- Lubraniec

- Lubsko
- Lubycza Królewska
- Lutomiersk
- Lututów
- Lwówek
- Lwówek Śląski

=== Ł ===
- Łabiszyn
- Łagów
- Łańcut
- Łapy
- Łasin
- Łask
- Łaskarzew
- Łaszczów

- Łaziska Górne
- Łazy
- Łeba
- Łęczna
- Łęczyca
- Łęknica
- Łobez
- Łobżenica

- Łochów
- Łomianki
- Łomża
- Łopuszno
- Łosice
- Łowicz
- Łódź
- Łuków

=== M ===
==== Ma ====
- Maciejowice
- Magnuszew
- Maków Mazowiecki
- Maków Podhalański
- Malbork
- Małkinia Górna

- Małogoszcz
- Małomice
- Margonin
- Marki
- Maszewo

==== Mi ====
- Miasteczko Krajeńskie
- Miasteczko Śląskie
- Miastko
- Michałowo
- Miechów
- Miejska Górka
- Mielec
- Mielno
- Mieroszów
- Mieszkowice
- Mieścisko

- Międzybórz
- Międzychód
- Międzylesie
- Międzyrzec Podlaski
- Międzyrzecz
- Międzyzdroje
- Miękinia
- Mikołajki
- Mikołów
- Mikstat

- Milanówek
- Milicz
- Miłakowo
- Miłomłyn
- Miłosław
- Mińsk Mazowiecki
- Mirosławiec
- Mirsk
- Mława
- Młynary

==== Mo-My ====
- Modliborzyce
- Mogielnica
- Mogilno
- Mońki
- Morąg
- Morawica
- Mordy

- Moryń
- Mosina
- Mrągowo
- Mrocza
- Mrozy
- Mszana Dolna
- Mszczonów

- Murowana Goślina
- Muszyna
- Mysłowice
- Myszków
- Myszyniec
- Myślenice
- Myślibórz

=== N ===
==== Na-Ni ====
- Nakło nad Notecią
- Nałęczów
- Namysłów
- Narol

- Nasielsk
- Nekla
- Nidzica
- Niemcza

- Niemodlin
- Niepołomice
- Nieszawa
- Nisko

==== No-Ny ====
- Nowa Dęba
- Nowa Ruda
- Nowa Sarzyna
- Nowa Słupia
- Nowa Sól
- Nowe
- Nowe Brzesko
- Nowe Miasteczko
- Nowe Miasto

- Nowe Miasto Lubawskie
- Nowe Miasto nad Pilicą
- Nowe Skalmierzyce
- Nowe Warpno
- Nowogard
- Nowogrodziec
- Nowogród
- Nowogród Bobrzański
- Nowy Dwór Gdański

- Nowy Dwór Mazowiecki
- Nowy Korczyn
- Nowy Sącz
- Nowy Staw
- Nowy Targ
- Nowy Tomyśl
- Nowy Wiśnicz
- Nysa

=== O ===
==== Ob-Or ====
- Oborniki
- Oborniki Śląskie
- Obrzycko
- Odolanów
- Odrzywół
- Ogrodzieniec
- Okonek
- Olecko
- Olesno
- Oleszyce

- Oleśnica, Lower Silesian Voivodeship
- Oleśnica
- Olkusz
- Olsztyn, Warmian-Masurian Voivodeship
- Olsztyn, Silesian Voivodeship
- Olsztynek
- Olszyna
- Oława
- Opalenica

- Opatów
- Opatowiec
- Opatówek
- Opoczno
- Opole
- Opole Lubelskie
- Orneta
- Orzesze
- Orzysz

==== Os-Oz ====
- Osieck
- Osieczna
- Osiek
- Osjaków
- Ostrołęka
- Ostroróg
- Ostrowiec Świętokrzyski

- Ostróda
- Ostrów Lubelski
- Ostrów Mazowiecka
- Ostrów Wielkopolski
- Ostrzeszów
- Ośno Lubuskie
- Oświęcim

- Otmuchów
- Otwock
- Otyń
- Ozimek
- Ozorków
- Ożarów
- Ożarów Mazowiecki

=== P ===
==== Pa-Pe ====
- Pabianice
- Pacanów
- Paczków
- Pajęczno
- Pakość
- Parczew

- Parzęczew
- Pasłęk
- Pasym
- Pelplin
- Pełczyce

==== Pi-Pl ====
- Piaseczno
- Piaski
- Piastów
- Piątek
- Piechowice
- Piekary Śląskie
- Piekoszów
- Pieniężno
- Pieńsk

- Pierzchnica
- Pieszyce
- Pilawa
- Pilica
- Pilzno
- Piła
- Piława Górna
- Pińczów
- Pionki

- Piotrków Kujawski
- Piotrków Trybunalski
- Pisz
- Piszczac
- Piwniczna-Zdrój
- Pleszew
- Płock
- Płońsk
- Płoty

==== Pn-Po ====
- Pniewy
- Pobiedziska
- Poddębice
- Podkowa Leśna
- Pogorzela

- Polanica-Zdrój
- Polanów
- Police
- Polkowice
- Połaniec

- Połczyn-Zdrój
- Poniatowa
- Poniec
- Poręba
- Poznań

==== Pr-Py ====
- Prabuty
- Praszka
- Prochowice
- Proszowice
- Prószków
- Pruchnik
- Prudnik
- Prusice
- Pruszcz
- Pruszcz Gdański

- Pruszków
- Przasnysz
- Przecław
- Przedbórz
- Przedecz
- Przemków
- Przemyśl
- Przeworsk
- Przyrów
- Przysucha

- Przytyk
- Pszczyna
- Pszów
- Puck
- Puławy
- Pułtusk
- Puszczykowo
- Pyrzyce
- Pyskowice
- Pyzdry

=== R ===
==== Ra ====
- Rabka
- Raciąż
- Racibórz
- Radków
- Radlin
- Radłów
- Radom

- Radomsko
- Radomyśl Wielki
- Radoszyce
- Radymno
- Radziejów
- Radzionków
- Radzymin

- Radzyń Chełmiński
- Radzyń Podlaski
- Rajgród
- Rakoniewice
- Raszków
- Rawa Mazowiecka
- Rawicz

==== Re-Rz ====
- Recz
- Reda
- Rejowiec
- Rejowiec Fabryczny
- Resko
- Reszel
- Rogoźno
- Ropczyce
- Rozprza

- Różan
- Ruciane-Nida
- Ruda Śląska
- Rudnik nad Sanem
- Rumia
- Rybnik
- Rychtal
- Rychwał
- Rydułtowy

- Rydzyna
- Ryglice
- Ryki
- Rymanów
- Ryn
- Rypin
- Rzepin
- Rzeszów
- Rzgów

=== S ===
==== Sa-Si ====
- Sandomierz
- Sanniki
- Sanok
- Sejny
- Serock
- Sędziszów
- Sędziszów Małopolski

- Sępopol
- Sępólno Krajeńskie
- Sianów
- Siechnice
- Siedlce
- Siedliszcze
- Siemianowice Śląskie

- Siemiatycze
- Sieniawa
- Siennica
- Sienno
- Sieradz
- Sieraków
- Sierpc
- Siewierz

==== Sk-Sl ====
- Skalbmierz
- Skała
- Skarszewy
- Skaryszew
- Skarżysko-Kamienna
- Skawina
- Skępe

- Skierniewice
- Skoczów
- Skoki
- Skórcz
- Skwierzyna
- Sława

- Sławków
- Sławno
- Słomniki
- Słubice
- Słupca
- Słupsk

==== So ====
- Sobków
- Sobótka
- Sochaczew
- Sochocin
- Sokołów Małopolski
- Sokołów Podlaski
- Sokółka

- Solec Kujawski
- Solec nad Wisłą
- Sompolno
- Sopot
- Sosnowiec
- Sośnicowice

==== St ====
- Stalowa Wola
- Stanisławów
- Starachowice
- Stargard
- Starogard Gdański
- Staroźreby
- Stary Sącz
- Staszów
- Stawiski

- Stawiszyn
- Stąporków
- Stepnica
- Stęszew
- Stoczek Łukowski
- Stopnica
- Stronie Śląskie
- Strumień

- Stryków
- Strzegom
- Strzelce Krajeńskie
- Strzelce Opolskie
- Strzeleczki
- Strzelin
- Strzelno
- Strzyżów

==== Su-Sy ====
- Sucha Beskidzka
- Suchań
- Suchedniów
- Suchowola
- Sulechów
- Sulejów

- Sulejówek
- Sulęcin
- Sulmierzyce
- Sułkowice
- Supraśl

- Suraż
- Susz
- Suwałki
- Swarzędz
- Syców

==== Sz ====
- Szadek
- Szamocin
- Szamotuły
- Szczawnica
- Szczawno-Zdrój
- Szczebrzeszyn
- Szczecin

- Szczecinek
- Szczekociny
- Szczucin
- Szczuczyn
- Szczyrk
- Szczytna
- Szczytno

- Szepietowo
- Szklarska Poręba
- Szlichtyngowa
- Szprotawa
- Sztum
- Szubin
- Szydłowiec
- Szydłów

=== Ś ===
- Ścinawa
- Ślesin
- Śmigiel
- Śrem
- Środa Śląska
- Środa Wielkopolska

- Świątniki Górne
- Świdnica
- Świdnik
- Świdwin
- Świebodzice
- Świebodzin

- Świecie
- Świeradów-Zdrój
- Świerzawa
- Świętochłowice
- Świnoujście

=== T ===
- Tarczyn
- Tarnobrzeg
- Tarnogród
- Tarnowskie Góry
- Tarnów
- Tczew
- Terespol
- Tłuszcz
- Tolkmicko
- Tomaszów Lubelski
- Tomaszów Mazowiecki
- Toruń

- Torzym
- Toszek
- Trzcianka
- Trzciel
- Trzcińsko-Zdrój
- Trzebiatów
- Trzebinia
- Trzebnica
- Trzemeszno
- Tuchola
- Tuchów
- Tuczno

- Tuliszków
- Tułowice
- Turek
- Turobin
- Tuszyn
- Twardogóra
- Tychowo
- Tychy
- Tyczyn
- Tykocin
- Tyszowce

=== U ===
- Ujazd, Opole Voivodeship
- Ujazd, Tomaszów Mazowiecki County
- Ujście
- Ulanów
- Uniejów

- Urzędów
- Ustka
- Ustroń
- Ustrzyki Dolne

=== W ===
==== Wa-Wę ====
- Wadowice
- Wałbrzych
- Wałcz
- Warka
- Warsaw
- Warta

- Wasilków
- Wąbrzeźno
- Wąchock
- Wągrowiec
- Wąsosz
- Wąwolnica

- Wejherowo
- Węgliniec
- Węgorzewo
- Węgorzyno
- Węgrów

==== Wi-Wł ====
- Wiązów
- Wielbark
- Wieleń
- Wielichowo
- Wieliczka
- Wieluń
- Wieruszów

- Więcbork
- Wilamowice
- Wiskitki
- Wisła
- Wiślica
- Witkowo
- Witnica

- Wleń
- Władysławowo
- Włocławek
- Włodawa
- Włodowice
- Włoszczowa

==== Wo-Wy ====
- Wodzisław
- Wodzisław Śląski
- Wojcieszów
- Wojkowice
- Wojnicz
- Wolbórz
- Wolbrom
- Wolin

- Wolsztyn
- Wołczyn
- Wołomin
- Wołów
- Woźniki
- Wrocław
- Wronki
- Września

- Wschowa
- Wyrzysk
- Wysoka
- Wysokie Mazowieckie
- Wyszków
- Wyszogród
- Wyśmierzyce

=== Z ===
- Zabłudów
- Zabrze
- Zagórów
- Zagórz
- Zakliczyn
- Zaklików
- Zakopane
- Zakroczym
- Zalewo
- Zambrów
- Zamość
- Zaniemyśl
- Zator

- Zawadzkie
- Zawichost
- Zawidów
- Zawiercie
- Ząbki
- Ząbkowice Śląskie
- Zbąszynek
- Zbąszyń
- Zduny
- Zduńska Wola
- Zdzieszowice
- Zelów

- Zgierz
- Zgorzelec
- Zielona Góra
- Zielonka
- Ziębice
- Złocieniec
- Złoczew
- Złotoryja
- Złotów
- Złoty Stok
- Zwierzyniec
- Zwoleń

=== Ż ===
- Żabno
- Żagań
- Żarki
- Żarnów
- Żarów
- Żary

- Żelechów
- Żerków
- Żmigród
- Żnin
- Żory

- Żukowo
- Żuromin
- Żychlin
- Żyrardów
- Żywiec

== See also ==
- List of former towns of Poland
- List of Polish cities and towns damaged in World War II
- List of places which obtained/regained town status in the years since 1900: Nadania praw miejskich w Polsce po 1900 (Polish Wikipedia)
