= Belk (disambiguation) =

Belk is an American department store chain. Belk may also refer to:

== People ==
- Belk (surname)

== Places ==
=== Settlements ===
- Belk, Alabama
- Belk, Tennessee

=== Other places ===
- Belk Arena, arena on the campus of Davidson College
- Belk Freeway, alternate name for Interstate 277 in North Carolina
- Belk Gymnasium, gymnasium on the campus of the University of North Carolina at Charlotte
- Belk Hudson Lofts, apartment building in Huntsville, Alabama
- Belk Library (Elon University), library for Elon students, faculty, and staff
- Belk Theater, venue in the North Carolina Blumenthal Performing Arts Center

== See also ==
- Bełk (disambiguation)
