= Jeziorki, Świętokrzyskie Voivodeship =

Jeziorki
- Village
- Location within Poland
- Coordinates: 50°33′18″N 20°10′11″E
- Country: Poland
- Voivodeship: Świętokrzyskie
- County: Jędrzejów
- Gmina: Wodzisław

Jeziorki [jɛˈʑɔrki] is a village in the administrative district of Gmina Wodzisław, within Jędrzejów County, Świętokrzyskie Voivodeship, in south-central Poland. It lies approximately 5 km (3 mi) north of Wodzisław, 13 km (8 mi) south-west of Jędrzejów, and 49 km (30 mi) south-west of the regional capital Kielce.
