= Strzeszkowice =

- Village
- Location within Poland
- Coordinates: 50°31′57″N 20°16′59″E
- Country: Poland
- Voivodeship: Świętokrzyskie
- County: Jędrzejów
- Gmina: Wodzisław

Strzeszkowice [stʂɛʂkɔˈvit͡sɛ] is a village in the administrative district of Gmina Wodzisław, within Jędrzejów County, Świętokrzyskie Voivodeship, in south-central Poland. It lies approximately 7 km (4 mi) east of Wodzisław, 12 km (7 mi) south of Jędrzejów, and 46 km (29 mi) south-west of the regional capital Kielce.
