= Dzierszyn =

- Village
- Location within Poland
- Coordinates: 50°35′25″N 20°25′19″E
- Country: Poland
- Voivodeship: Świętokrzyskie
- County: Jędrzejów
- Gmina: Imielno
- Population: 170

Dzierszyn [ˈd͡ʑɛrʂɨn] is a village in the administrative district of Gmina Imielno, within Jędrzejów County, Świętokrzyskie Voivodeship, in south-central Poland. It lies approximately 2 km (1 mi) west of Imielno, 10 km (6 mi) south-east of Jędrzejów, and 36 km (22 mi) south-west of the regional capital Kielce.
