= Wygoda, Gmina Imielno =

Wygoda
- Village
- Location within Poland
- Coordinates: 50°36′10″N 20°27′24″E
- Country: Poland
- Voivodeship: Świętokrzyskie
- County: Jędrzejów
- Gmina: Imielno

Wygoda [vɨˈɡɔda] is a village in the administrative district of Gmina Imielno, within Jędrzejów County, Świętokrzyskie Voivodeship, in south-central Poland. It lies approximately 3 km (2 mi) north of Imielno, 12 km (7 mi) east of Jędrzejów, and 34 km (21 mi) south of the regional capital Kielce.
