= Niegosławice, Jędrzejów County =

Niegosławice
- Village
- Location within Poland
- Coordinates: 50°31′15″N 20°19′12″E
- Country: Poland
- Voivodeship: Świętokrzyskie
- County: Jędrzejów
- Gmina: Wodzisław
- Population: 400

Niegosławice [ɲɛɡɔswaˈvit͡sɛ] is a village in the administrative district of Gmina Wodzisław, within Jędrzejów County, Świętokrzyskie Voivodeship, in south-central Poland. It lies approximately 10 km (6 mi) east of Wodzisław, 13 km (8 mi) south of Jędrzejów, and 46 km (29 mi) south-west of the regional capital Kielce.
