= Imielnica =

- Village
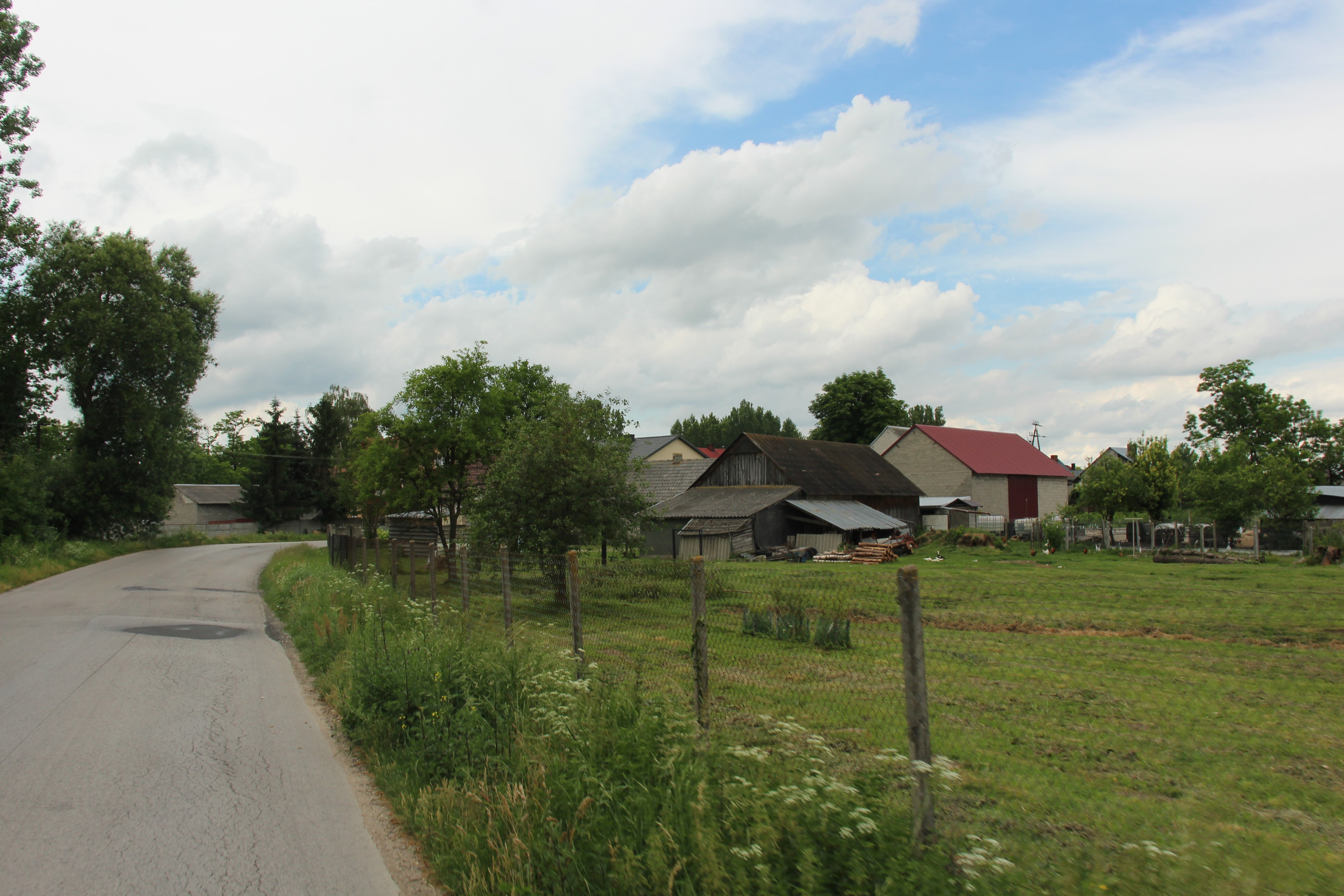

- Location within Poland
- Coordinates: 50°34′32″N 20°26′53″E
- Country: Poland
- Voivodeship: Świętokrzyskie
- County: Jędrzejów
- Gmina: Imielno

Imielnica [imjɛlˈnit͡sa] is a village in the administrative district of Gmina Imielno, within Jędrzejów County, Świętokrzyskie Voivodeship, in south-central Poland. It lies approximately 2 km (1 mi) south of Imielno, 13 km (8 mi) south-east of Jędrzejów, and 37 km (23 mi) south of the regional capital Kielce.
