= Mieronice, Gmina Wodzisław =

Mieronice
- Village
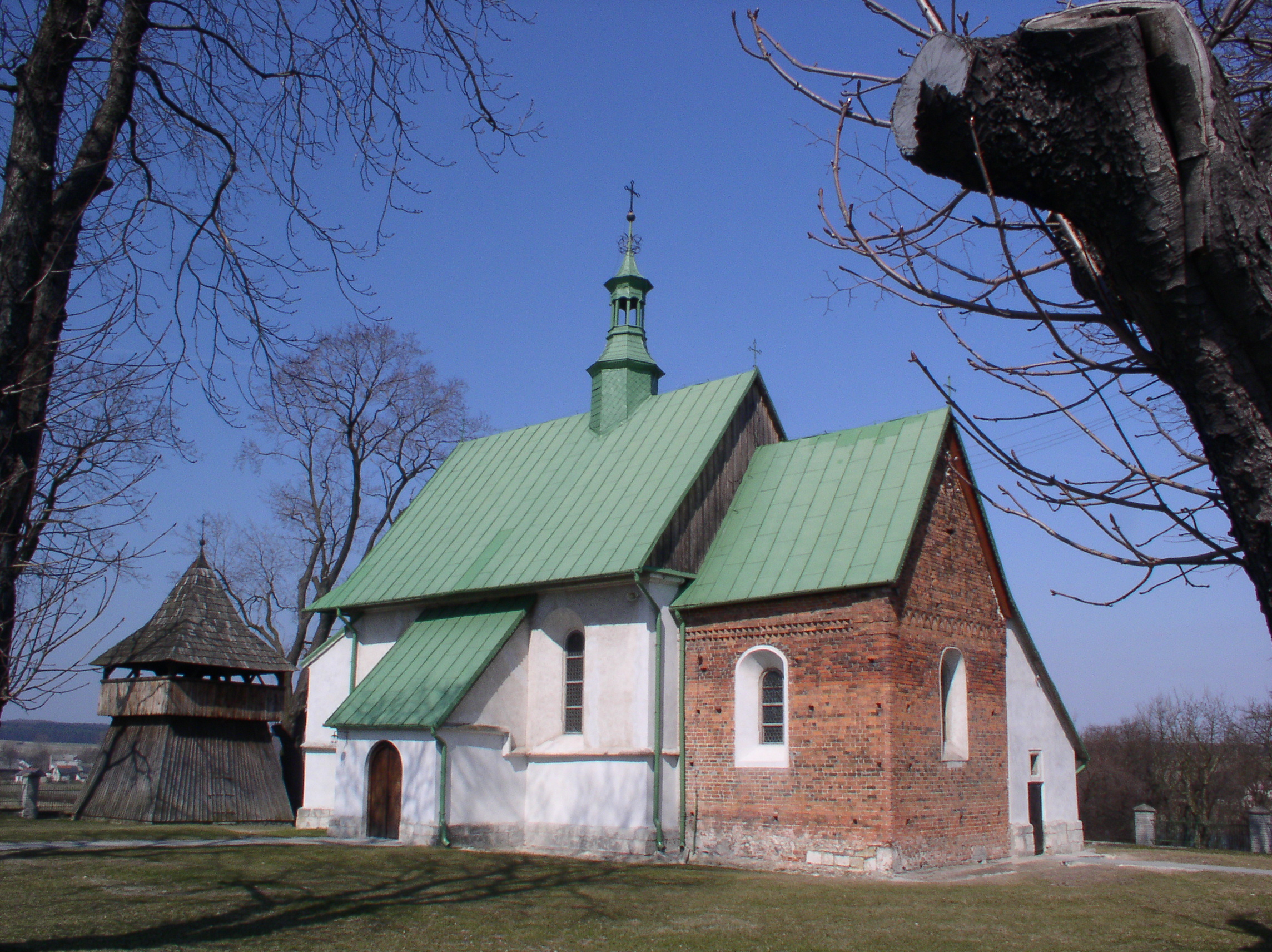
- Catholic church

- Location within Poland
- Coordinates: 50°31′26″N 20°9′15″E
- Country: Poland
- Voivodeship: Świętokrzyskie
- County: Jędrzejów
- Gmina: Wodzisław

Mieronice [mjɛrɔˈnit͡sɛ] is a village in the administrative district of Gmina Wodzisław, within Jędrzejów County, Świętokrzyskie Voivodeship, in south-central Poland. It lies approximately 3 km (2 mi) west of Wodzisław, 16 km (10 mi) south-west of Jędrzejów, and 52 km (32 mi) south-west of the regional capital Kielce.
