= Klemencice =

- Village
- Location within Poland
- Coordinates: 50°32′57″N 20°12′6″E
- Country: Poland
- Voivodeship: Świętokrzyskie
- County: Jędrzejów
- Gmina: Wodzisław

Klemencice [klɛmɛnˈt͡ɕit͡sɛ] is a village in the administrative district of Gmina Wodzisław, within Jędrzejów County, Świętokrzyskie Voivodeship, in south-central Poland. It lies approximately 4 km (2 mi) north of Wodzisław, 12 km (7 mi) south-west of Jędrzejów, and 48 km (30 mi) south-west of the regional capital Kielce.
