= Przyłęczek =

- Village
- Location within Poland
- Coordinates: 50°34′N 20°15′E
- Country: Poland
- Voivodeship: Świętokrzyskie
- County: Jędrzejów
- Gmina: Wodzisław

Przyłęczek [pʂɨˈwɛnt͡ʂɛk] is a village in the administrative district of Gmina Wodzisław, within Jędrzejów County, Świętokrzyskie Voivodeship, in south-central Poland. It lies approximately 7 km (4 mi) north-east of Wodzisław, 9 km (6 mi) south-west of Jędrzejów, and 44 km (27 mi) south-west of the regional capital Kielce.
