= Judasze =

- Village
- Location within Poland
- Coordinates: 50°32′24″N 20°15′28″E
- Country: Poland
- Voivodeship: Świętokrzyskie
- County: Jędrzejów
- Gmina: Wodzisław

Judasze [juˈdaʂɛ] is a village in the administrative district of Gmina Wodzisław, within Jędrzejów County, Świętokrzyskie Voivodeship, in south-central Poland. It lies approximately 6 km (4 mi) north-east of Wodzisław, 11 km (7 mi) south of Jędrzejów, and 46 km (29 mi) south-west of the regional capital Kielce.
