= Kawęczyn, Jędrzejów County =

Kawęczyn
- Village
- Location within Poland
- Coordinates: 50°34′50″N 20°20′38″E
- Country: Poland
- Voivodeship: Świętokrzyskie
- County: Jędrzejów
- Gmina: Imielno

Kawęczyn [kaˈvɛnt͡ʂɨn] is a village in the administrative district of Gmina Imielno, within Jędrzejów County, Świętokrzyskie Voivodeship, in south-central Poland. It lies approximately 8 km (5 mi) west of Imielno, 7 km (4 mi) south-east of Jędrzejów, and 39 km (24 mi) south-west of the regional capital Kielce.
