= Droblin, Świętokrzyskie Voivodeship =

Droblin
- Village
- Location within Poland
- Coordinates: 50°29′50″N 20°12′30″E
- Country: Poland
- Voivodeship: Świętokrzyskie
- County: Jędrzejów
- Gmina: Wodzisław

Droblin [ˈdrɔblin] is a village in the administrative district of Gmina Wodzisław, within Jędrzejów County, Świętokrzyskie Voivodeship, in south-central Poland. It lies approximately 3 km (2 mi) south-east of Wodzisław, 17 km (11 mi) south-west of Jędrzejów, and 52 km (32 mi) south-west of the regional capital Kielce.
