= Brzeście, Jędrzejów County =

Brzeście
- Village
- Location within Poland
- Coordinates: 50°30′52″N 20°7′51″E
- Country: Poland
- Voivodeship: Świętokrzyskie
- County: Jędrzejów
- Gmina: Wodzisław

Brzeście [ˈbʐɛɕt͡ɕɛ] is a village in the administrative district of Gmina Wodzisław, within Jędrzejów County, Świętokrzyskie Voivodeship, in south-central Poland. It lies approximately 5 km (3 mi) west of Wodzisław, 18 km (11 mi) south-west of Jędrzejów, and 54 km (34 mi) south-west of the regional capital Kielce.
