= Węgleszyn =

- Village
- Location within Poland
- Coordinates: 50°45′14″N 20°10′11″E
- Country: Poland
- Voivodeship: Świętokrzyskie
- County: Jędrzejów
- Gmina: Oksa
- Population: 600

Węgleszyn [vɛŋˈɡlɛʂɨn] is a village in the administrative district of Gmina Oksa, within Jędrzejów County, Świętokrzyskie Voivodeship, in south-central Poland. It lies approximately 6 km (4 mi) north-east of Oksa, 17 km (11 mi) north-west of Jędrzejów, and 35 km (22 mi) south-west of the regional capital Kielce.
