= Krężoły, Świętokrzyskie Voivodeship =

Krężoły
- Village
- Location within Poland
- Coordinates: 50°31′6″N 20°5′38″E
- Country: Poland
- Voivodeship: Świętokrzyskie
- County: Jędrzejów
- Gmina: Wodzisław

Krężoły [krɛ̃ˈʐɔwɨ] is a village in the administrative district of Gmina Wodzisław, within Jędrzejów County, Świętokrzyskie Voivodeship, in south-central Poland. It lies approximately 7 km (4 mi) west of Wodzisław, 20 km (12 mi) south-west of Jędrzejów, and 55 km (34 mi) south-west of the regional capital Kielce.
