= Zalesie, Jędrzejów County =

Zalesie
- Village
- Location within Poland
- Coordinates: 50°38′11″N 20°09′51″E
- Country: Poland
- Voivodeship: Świętokrzyskie
- County: Jędrzejów
- Gmina: Oksa

Zalesie [zaˈlɛɕɛ] is a village in the administrative district of Gmina Oksa, within Jędrzejów County, Świętokrzyskie Voivodeship, in south-central Poland. It lies approximately 12 km (7 mi) south-east of Oksa, 10 km (6 mi) west of Jędrzejów, and 43 km (27 mi) south-west of the regional capital Kielce.
