= Zakrzów, Jędrzejów County =

Zakrzów
- Village
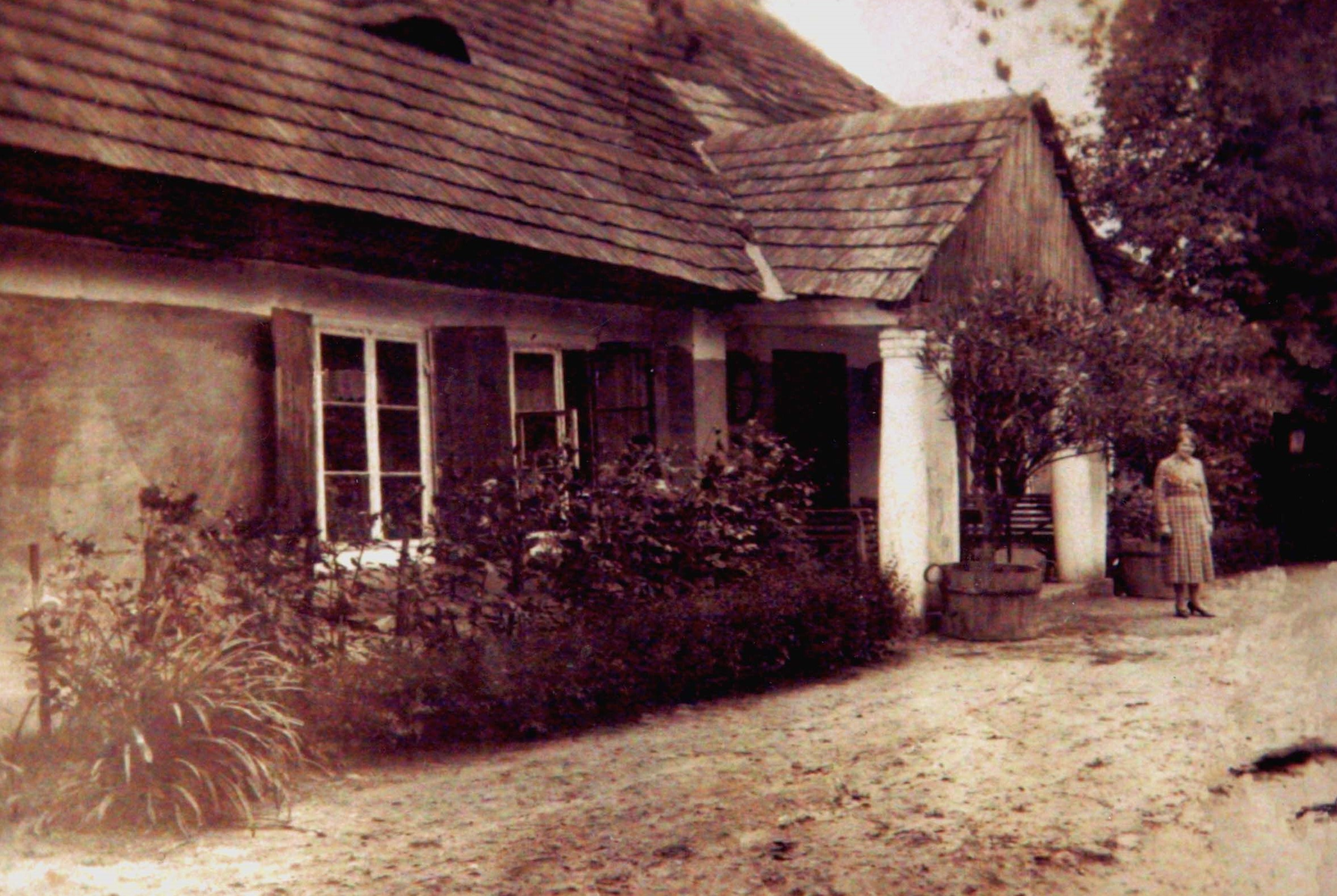
- Former manor house

- Location within Poland
- Coordinates: 50°46′12″N 20°7′31″E
- Country: Poland
- Voivodeship: Świętokrzyskie
- County: Jędrzejów
- Gmina: Oksa
- Population: 280

Zakrzów [ˈzakʂuf] is a village in the administrative district of Gmina Oksa, within Jędrzejów County, Świętokrzyskie Voivodeship, in south-central Poland. It lies approximately 5 km (3 mi) north of Oksa, 20 km (12 mi) north-west of Jędrzejów, and 37 km (23 mi) west of the regional capital Kielce.
