= Popowice, Świętokrzyskie Voivodeship =

Popowice
- Village
- Location within Poland
- Coordinates: 50°42′24″N 20°8′18″E
- Country: Poland
- Voivodeship: Świętokrzyskie
- County: Jędrzejów
- Gmina: Oksa

Popowice [pɔpɔˈvit͡sɛ] is a village in the administrative district of Gmina Oksa, within Jędrzejów County, Świętokrzyskie Voivodeship, in south-central Poland. It lies approximately 4 km (2 mi) south-east of Oksa, 15 km (9 mi) north-west of Jędrzejów, and 39 km (24 mi) south-west of the regional capital Kielce.
