= Zarzecze, Świętokrzyskie Voivodeship =

Zarzecze
- Village
- Location within Poland
- Coordinates: 50°31′12″N 20°15′55″E
- Country: Poland
- Voivodeship: Świętokrzyskie
- County: Jędrzejów
- Gmina: Wodzisław

Zarzecze [zaˈʐɛt͡ʂɛ] is a village in the administrative district of Gmina Wodzisław, within Jędrzejów County, Świętokrzyskie Voivodeship, in south-central Poland. It lies approximately 6 km (4 mi) east of Wodzisław, 13 km (8 mi) south of Jędrzejów, and 48 km (30 mi) south-west of the regional capital Kielce.
