= Brzezinki, Jędrzejów County =

Brzezinki
- Village
- Location within Poland
- Coordinates: 50°28′59″N 20°16′4″E
- Country: Poland
- Voivodeship: Świętokrzyskie
- County: Jędrzejów
- Gmina: Wodzisław

Brzezinki [bʐɛˈʑinki] is a village in the administrative district of Gmina Wodzisław, within Jędrzejów County, Świętokrzyskie Voivodeship, in south-central Poland. It lies approximately 7 km (4 mi) south-east of Wodzisław, 17 km (11 mi) south of Jędrzejów, and 51 km (32 mi) south-west of the regional capital Kielce.
