= Lubcza, Świętokrzyskie Voivodeship =

Lubcza
- Village
- Location within Poland
- Coordinates: 50°28′39″N 20°20′19″E
- Country: Poland
- Voivodeship: Świętokrzyskie
- County: Jędrzejów
- Gmina: Wodzisław

Lubcza [ˈlupt͡ʂa] is a village in the administrative district of Gmina Wodzisław, within Jędrzejów County, Świętokrzyskie Voivodeship, in south-central Poland. It lies approximately 12 km (7 mi) south-east of Wodzisław, 18 km (11 mi) south of Jędrzejów, and 50 km (31 mi) south-west of the regional capital Kielce.
