= Błogoszów =

- Village
- Location within Poland
- Coordinates: 50°45′40″N 20°5′39″E
- Country: Poland
- Voivodeship: Świętokrzyskie
- County: Jędrzejów
- Gmina: Oksa
- Population: 430

Błogoszów [bwɔˈɡɔʂuf] is a village in the administrative district of Gmina Oksa, within Jędrzejów County, Świętokrzyskie Voivodeship, in south-central Poland. It lies approximately 4 km (2 mi) north of Oksa, 21 km (13 mi) north-west of Jędrzejów, and 40 km (25 mi) west of the regional capital Kielce.
