= Tyniec, Świętokrzyskie Voivodeship =

Tyniec
- Village
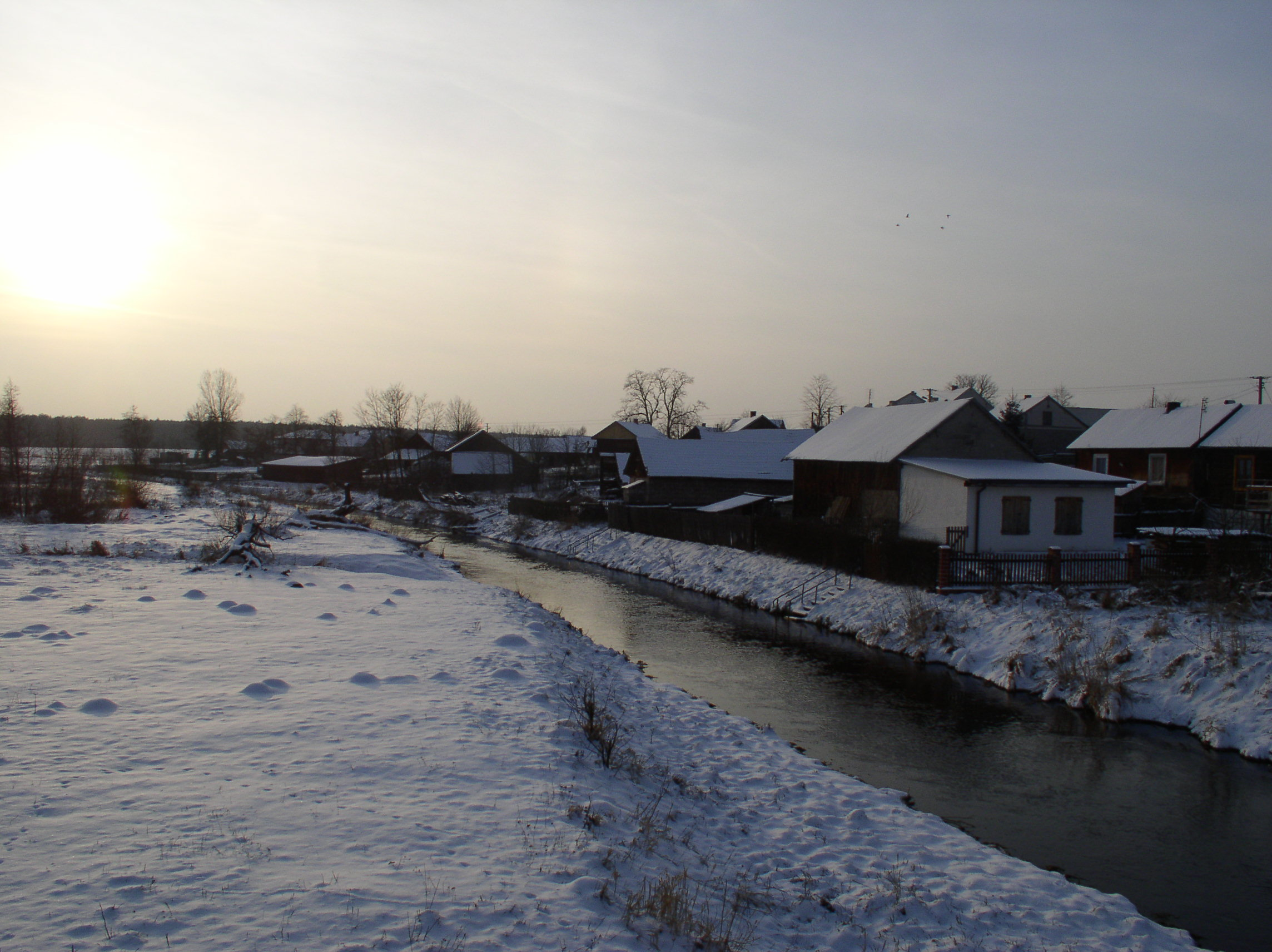

- Location within Poland
- Coordinates: 50°42′44″N 20°10′44″E
- Country: Poland
- Voivodeship: Świętokrzyskie
- County: Jędrzejów
- Gmina: Oksa

Tyniec [ˈtɨɲɛt͡s] is a village in the administrative district of Gmina Oksa, within Jędrzejów County, Świętokrzyskie Voivodeship, in south-central Poland. It lies approximately 6 km (4 mi) east of Oksa, 13 km (8 mi) north-west of Jędrzejów, and 37 km (23 mi) south-west of the regional capital Kielce.
