= Węgleszyn-Dębina =

- Village
- Location within Poland
- Coordinates: 50°45′44″N 20°9′5″E
- Country: Poland
- Voivodeship: Świętokrzyskie
- County: Jędrzejów
- Gmina: Oksa

Węgleszyn-Dębina [vɛŋˈɡlɛʂɨn dɛmˈbina] is a village in the administrative district of Gmina Oksa, within Jędrzejów County, Świętokrzyskie Voivodeship, in south-central Poland. It lies approximately 6 km (4 mi) north-east of Oksa, 18 km (11 mi) north-west of Jędrzejów, and 36 km (22 mi) west of the regional capital Kielce.
