= Przyrąb =

- Village
- Location within Poland
- Coordinates: 50°30′N 20°19′E
- Country: Poland
- Voivodeship: Świętokrzyskie
- County: Jędrzejów
- Gmina: Wodzisław

Przyrąb [ˈpʂɨrɔmp] is a village in the administrative district of Gmina Wodzisław, within Jędrzejów County, Świętokrzyskie Voivodeship, in south-central Poland. It lies approximately 10 km (6 mi) east of Wodzisław, 15 km (9 mi) south of Jędrzejów, and 48 km (30 mi) south-west of the regional capital Kielce.
