= Sobowice =

- Village
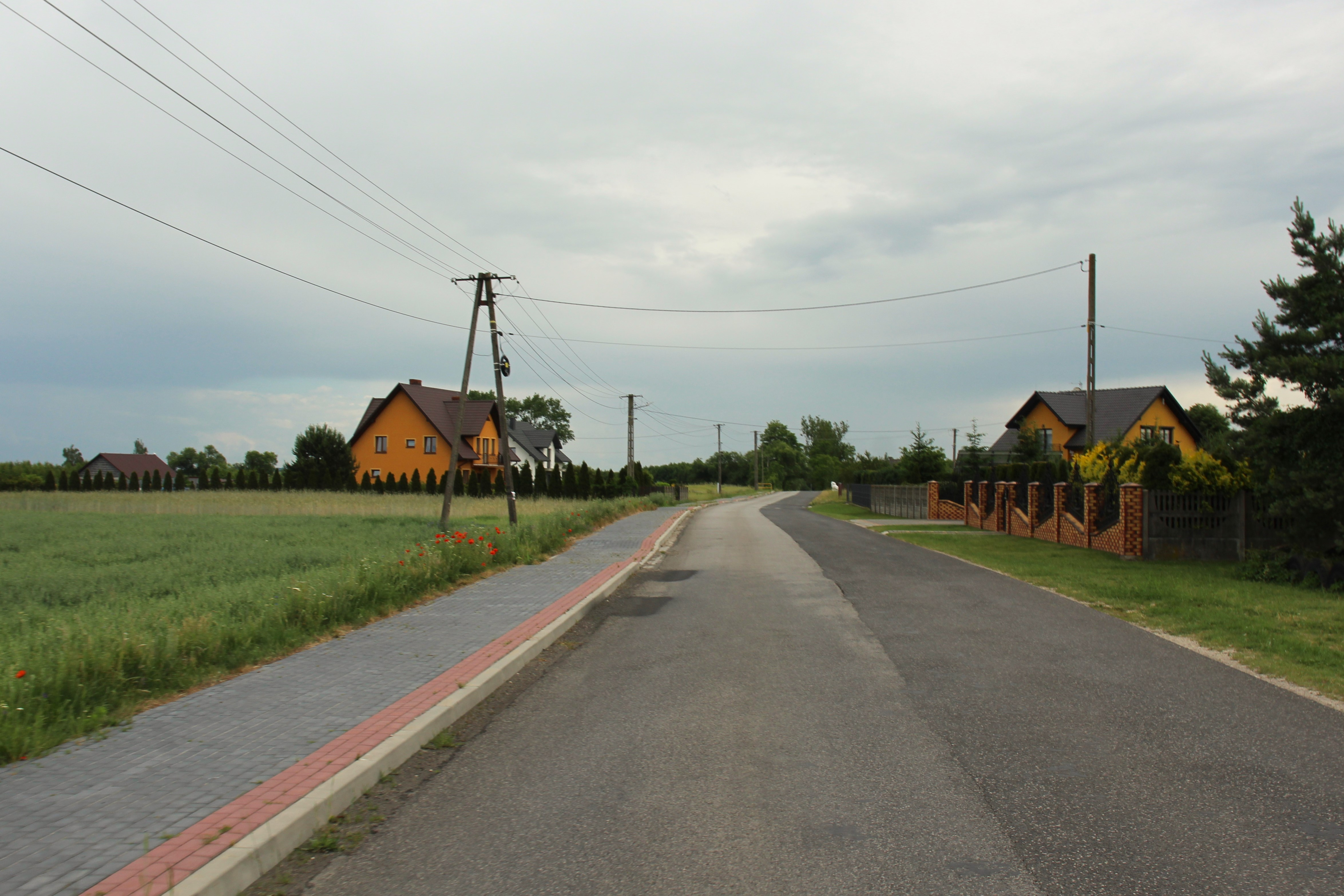

- Location within Poland
- Coordinates: 50°33′N 20°27′E
- Country: Poland
- Voivodeship: Świętokrzyskie
- County: Jędrzejów
- Gmina: Imielno

Sobowice [sɔbɔˈvit͡sɛ] is a village in the administrative district of Gmina Imielno, within Jędrzejów County, Świętokrzyskie Voivodeship, in south-central Poland. It lies approximately 4 km (2 mi) south of Imielno, 15 km (9 mi) south-east of Jędrzejów, and 39 km (24 mi) south of the regional capital Kielce.
