= Jakubów, Jędrzejów County =

Jakubów
- Village
- Location within Poland
- Coordinates: 50°36′14″N 20°25′32″E
- Country: Poland
- Voivodeship: Świętokrzyskie
- County: Jędrzejów
- Gmina: Imielno

Jakubów [jaˈkubuf] is a village in the administrative district of Gmina Imielno, within Jędrzejów County, Świętokrzyskie Voivodeship, in south-central Poland. It lies approximately 3 km (2 mi) north-west of Imielno, 10 km (6 mi) east of Jędrzejów, and 34 km (21 mi) south-west of the regional capital Kielce.
