= Kaziny =

- Village
- Location within Poland
- Coordinates: 50°33′N 20°9′E
- Country: Poland
- Voivodeship: Świętokrzyskie
- County: Jędrzejów
- Gmina: Wodzisław

Kaziny [kaˈʑinɨ] is a village in the administrative district of Gmina Wodzisław, within Jędrzejów County, Świętokrzyskie Voivodeship, in south-central Poland. It lies approximately 5 km (3 mi) north-west of Wodzisław, 15 km (9 mi) south-west of Jędrzejów, and 50 km (31 mi) south-west of the regional capital Kielce.
