= Anatoly Motsny =

Soviet senior lieutenant (1922–1960)

Anatoly Andreyevich Motsny
- Анатолий Андреевич Моцный
- Born: September 25, 1922; Shklow, Mogilev Region, Byelorussian SSR
- Died: February 1, 1960 (aged 37)
- Relatives: Semyon Khokhryakov
- Military career
- Allegiance: USSR
- Branch: Armored warfare
- Service years: 1941–1945
- Rank: Senior lieutenant
- Commands: Tank platoon in the 54th Guards Tank Brigade
- Conflicts: World War II
- Awards: Hero of the Soviet Union; Order of Lenin; Order of the Red Banner; Order of the Patriotic War; Stripped of all titles and awards in connection with the conviction

Anatoly Andreyevich Motsny (Russian: Анатолий Андреевич Моцный, Belarusian: Анатоль Андрэевіч Моцны, 25 September 1922 – 1 February 1960) was a senior lieutenant of the Red Army, a participant in the Eastern Front of World War II, and a Hero of the Soviet Union, stripped of all titles and awards due to a conviction for the murder of his son.

== Life ==
Anatoly Motsny was born on 25 September 1922 in Shklow, Mogilev Region of the Byelorussian Soviet Socialist Republic, to a working-class family. He graduated from tenth grade in school. In February 1941, he was drafted into the Red Army. In August 1942, he graduated from the Armored Vehicle School in Gorky. From October 1942, he served on the Eastern Front.

Motsny first saw combat on the Don Front in November 1942. There, he was appointed commander of a T-34 tank platoon in the 16th Separate Tank Regiment. In January 1943, he was wounded. From March 1943, he again saw combat on the Southwestern Front, commanding a platoon of KV heavy tanks in the 22nd Separate Tank Regiment. In April 1943, Motsny was sent to the reserve of the 29th Separate Training Tank Regiment, androm June of the same year, to the 2nd Reserve Tank Regiment of the Ural Military District.

In August 1943, Motsny was appointed commander of a T-34 tank platoon in the 54th Guards Tank Brigade of the 7th Guards Tank Corps on the Voronezh Front, which he served in until the end of the war. On 28 August, he was lightly wounded and soon returned to his unit. Until October 1943, the brigade fought in battles in Ukraine. From 4–11 November 1943, Motsny participated in the liberation of Kiev. On 6 November 1943, Motsny, in his tank, managed to destroy up to 100 enemy carts retreating from Kiev carrying military supplies and equipment, ten vehicles, and killing about 100 German soldiers and officers. During the battle, Motsny's tank was knocked out by a Tiger I tank, but the tank crew managed to capture a communications vehicle with six radios and five guns. When the retreating column was completely routed, Motsny's tank was withdrawn from the battlefield for repairs. For this battle, the battalion commander nominated Motsny and his tank's driver-mechanic Morozov for the title of Hero of the Soviet Union. However, the award was reduced by higher commanders, and they were ultimately awarded the Order of the Red Banner.

Between December 1943 to February 1944, Motsny was lightly wounded twice but quickly returned to duty. On 25 February, near Proskurov, he was seriously wounded. On 17 July 1944, during the battle for the village of Kiritsa, he destroyed an anti-tank gun and its crew with his tank. During the battle, the tank was knocked out, and Motsny, wounded, killed 11 German soldiers and officers with machine gun fire. When the machine gun was disabled, Motsny killed two German soldiers with a knife in melee combat. His actions allowed his subordinates to escape enemy fire.

He particularly distinguished himself during the Vistula–Oder Offensive. On 14 January 1945, the brigade crossed the Nida River near the village of Motkowice and captured the town of Jędrzejów. Advancing further, tankers from Hero of the Soviet Union Semyon Khokhryakov's battalion, which included Motsny's platoon, destroyed an oncoming German vehicle convoy, a military airfield, and liberated the village of Nagłowice. On 16 January, the tankers crossed the Pilica river and liberated the town of Koniecpol. On the way to the city of Częstochowa was the heavily fortified village of Mstów. Motsny's platoon was among the first to storm the city's streets, inflicting heavy losses on the enemy in the battle. During the street fighting for Częstochowa, Motsny's tank was knocked out, but the crew continued to fight. While firing a machine gun, Motsny was shell-shocked and seriously wounded in the shoulder; he lost his left eye to shrapnel, but he did not leave the battlefield until the city was completely cleared. He was taken unconscious to a field hospital. All three tanks of Motsny's platoon were lost, and their commanders Zolotov and Zaitsev were killed.

For the capture of Częstochowa, the 54th Guards Tank Brigade was awarded the Order of Lenin, and Khokhryakov was nominated for a second star of the Hero of the Soviet Union. Motsny and his tank's driver-mechanic, Ivan Ivanov, were nominated for Hero of the Soviet Union. On 10 April 1945, by the Decree of the Presidium of the Supreme Soviet of the Soviet Union, for "exemplary performance of combat missions of the command on the front in the fight against the Nazi invaders and the courage and heroism displayed in doing so," Guards Senior Lieutenant Motsny was awarded the high title of Hero of the Soviet Union with the Order of Lenin and the Gold Star, number 6541.

Despite his serious injuries and the loss of his left eye, Motsny returned to duty by the start of the Battle of Berlin, where he saw combat for the last time. After the war, he briefly served as a support platoon commander in his battalion. However, due to the six wounds he sustained during the war, he was deemed unfit for active duty and in September 1945, he was discharged to the reserves.

He was awarded the Order of the Red Banner on 30 January 1944, the order of the Patriotic War, 1st degree on 8 August 1944 and the Order of Lenin on 10 April 1945.

== Conviction ==
Upon returning to his native Shklow, Motsny served as chairman of the Physical Culture and Sports Committee of the Shklow District Executive Committee. He married Vera Komissarova, a hospital nurse he met in 1944. Their marriage did not work out, and Motsny kicked his pregnant wife out of the house. Later, with a second passport, he married again in Kiev, but was not prosecuted for bigamy as a Hero of the Soviet Union. For the same reason, he was not prosecuted for unauthorised possession of a TT pistol, which he brought back from the front.

On the night of 31 March – 1 April 1952, Tatyana Motsnaya, Anatoly's mother, returned home from work to find her house on fire. Anatoly's 5-year-old son, Gennady, had been brutally murdered: his head had been crushed, and his leg had been broken at the knee. The body was covered with rags, among which were two of Anatoly's bloodied shirts. In the morning, Anatoly was found hiding in the latrine pit. His documents were also found there.

On 7 June 1952, Motsny was convicted under Article 80 of the Criminal Code of the Byelorussian SSR (banditry) and, since the death penalty for murder had been abolished by that time, sentenced to 25 years in a labor camp. After an appeal, the sentence was reclassified as murder, and the sentence was set at ten years.

He was released early in April 1958, after which he returned to Shklow. According to local authorities, after his release, he led an antisocial lifestyle, abused alcohol, was unemployed, and "terrorised the local population."

On 1 July 1959, by decree of the Presidium of the Supreme Soviet, Motsny was stripped of all titles and awards for "committing acts incompatible with the status of a recipient of the Order." He died on 1 February 1960.
