= Opatkowice Pojałowskie =

- Village
- Location within Poland
- Coordinates: 50°33′N 20°22′E
- Country: Poland
- Voivodeship: Świętokrzyskie
- County: Jędrzejów
- Gmina: Imielno

Opatkowice Pojałowskie [ɔpatkɔˈvit͡sɛ pɔjaˈwɔfskʲɛ] is a village in the administrative district of Gmina Imielno, within Jędrzejów County, Świętokrzyskie Voivodeship, in south-central Poland. It lies approximately 8 km (5 mi) south-west of Imielno, 11 km (7 mi) south-east of Jędrzejów, and 41 km (25 mi) south-west of the regional capital Kielce.
