= Pękosław, Świętokrzyskie Voivodeship =

Pękosław
- Village
- Location within Poland
- Coordinates: 50°31′N 20°5′E
- Country: Poland
- Voivodeship: Świętokrzyskie
- County: Jędrzejów
- Gmina: Wodzisław

Pękosław [pɛŋˈkɔswaf] is a village in the administrative district of Gmina Wodzisław, within Jędrzejów County, Świętokrzyskie Voivodeship, in south-central Poland. It lies approximately 8 km (5 mi) west of Wodzisław, 21 km (13 mi) south-west of Jędrzejów, and 56 km (35 mi) south-west of the regional capital Kielce.
