= Sielec, Jędrzejów County =

Sielec
- Village
- Location within Poland
- Coordinates: 50°31′50″N 20°8′7″E
- Country: Poland
- Voivodeship: Świętokrzyskie
- County: Jędrzejów
- Gmina: Wodzisław

Sielec [ˈɕɛlɛt͡s] is a village in the administrative district of Gmina Wodzisław, within Jędrzejów County, Świętokrzyskie Voivodeship, in south-central Poland. It lies approximately 5 km (3 mi) west of Wodzisław, 17 km (11 mi) south-west of Jędrzejów, and 52 km (32 mi) south-west of the regional capital Kielce.
