= Konary, Jędrzejów County =

Konary
- Village
- Location within Poland
- Coordinates: 50°31′46″N 20°17′54″E
- Country: Poland
- Voivodeship: Świętokrzyskie
- County: Jędrzejów
- Gmina: Wodzisław

Konary [kɔˈnarɨ] is a village in the administrative district of Gmina Wodzisław, within Jędrzejów County, Świętokrzyskie Voivodeship, in south-central Poland. It lies approximately 8 km (5 mi) east of Wodzisław, 12 km (7 mi) south of Jędrzejów, and 46 km (29 mi) south-west of the regional capital Kielce.
