= Przyłęk, Świętokrzyskie Voivodeship =

Przyłęk
- Village
- Location within Poland
- Coordinates: 50°33′3″N 20°15′52″E
- Country: Poland
- Voivodeship: Świętokrzyskie
- County: Jędrzejów
- Gmina: Wodzisław

Przyłęk [ˈpʂɨwɛŋk] is a village in the administrative district of Gmina Wodzisław, within Jędrzejów County, Świętokrzyskie Voivodeship, in south-central Poland. It lies approximately 7 km (4 mi) north-east of Wodzisław, 10 km (6 mi) south of Jędrzejów, and 45 km (28 mi) south-west of the regional capital Kielce.
