= Kowalów Dolny =

- Village
- Location within Poland
- Coordinates: 50°30′23″N 20°6′30″E
- Country: Poland
- Voivodeship: Świętokrzyskie
- County: Jędrzejów
- Gmina: Wodzisław

Kowalów Dolny [kɔˈvaluf ˈdɔlnɨ] is a village in the administrative district of Gmina Wodzisław, within Jędrzejów County, Świętokrzyskie Voivodeship, in south-central Poland. It lies approximately 7 km (4 mi) west of Wodzisław, 20 km (12 mi) south-west of Jędrzejów, and 56 km (35 mi) south-west of the regional capital Kielce.
