= Piotrkowice, Jędrzejów County =

Piotrkowice
- Village
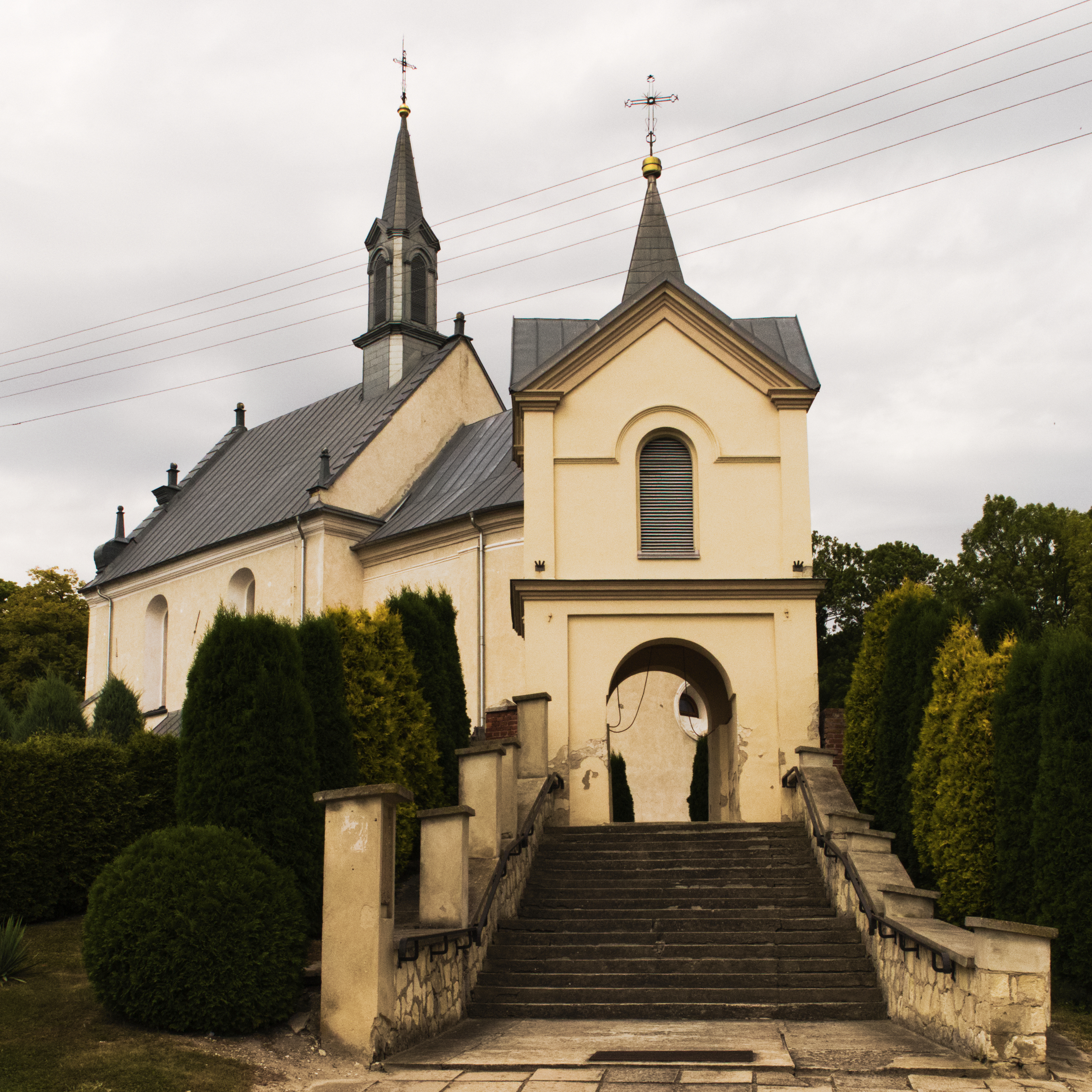
- Catholic church

- Location within Poland
- Coordinates: 50°31′3″N 20°14′38″E
- Country: Poland
- Voivodeship: Świętokrzyskie
- County: Jędrzejów
- Gmina: Wodzisław
- Website: http://piotrkowice.civ.pl/

Piotrkowice [pjɔtrkɔˈvit͡sɛ] is a village in the administrative district of Gmina Wodzisław, within Jędrzejów County, Świętokrzyskie Voivodeship, in south-central Poland. It lies approximately 4 km (2 mi) east of Wodzisław, 14 km (9 mi) south of Jędrzejów, and 49 km (30 mi) south-west of the regional capital Kielce.
