= Lipno, Świętokrzyskie Voivodeship =

Lipno
- Village
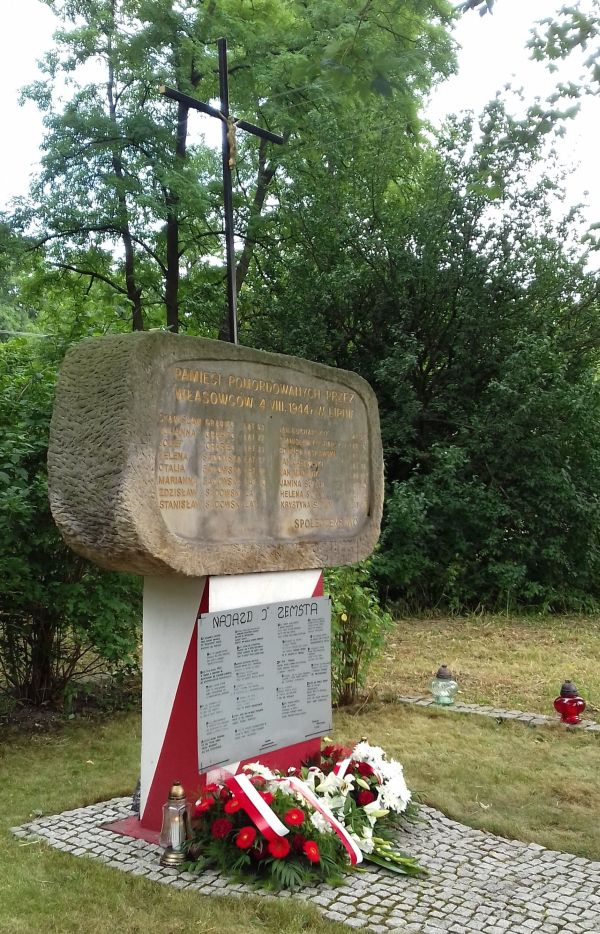

- Location within Poland
- Coordinates: 50°47′9″N 20°6′39″E
- Country: Poland
- Voivodeship: Świętokrzyskie
- County: Jędrzejów
- Gmina: Oksa
- Population: 370

Lipno (Polish pronunciation: [ˈlipnɔ]) is a village in the administrative district of Gmina Oksa, within Jędrzejów County, Świętokrzyskie Voivodeship, in south-central Poland. It lies approximately 7 km (4 mi) north of Oksa, 22 km (14 mi) north-west of Jędrzejów, and 38 km (24 mi) west of the regional capital Kielce.
