= Dębiany, Jędrzejów County =

Dębiany
- Village
- Location within Poland
- Coordinates: 50°33′7″N 20°18′3″E
- Country: Poland
- Voivodeship: Świętokrzyskie
- County: Jędrzejów
- Gmina: Wodzisław

Dębiany [dɛmˈbjanɨ] is a village in the administrative district of Gmina Wodzisław, within Jędrzejów County, Świętokrzyskie Voivodeship, in south-central Poland. It lies approximately 9 km (6 mi) north-east of Wodzisław, 10 km (6 mi) south of Jędrzejów, and 43 km (27 mi) south-west of the regional capital Kielce.
