= Wodacz =

- Village
- Location within Poland
- Coordinates: 50°29′N 20°10′E
- Country: Poland
- Voivodeship: Świętokrzyskie
- County: Jędrzejów
- Gmina: Wodzisław

Wodacz [ˈvɔdat͡ʂ] is a village in the administrative district of Gmina Wodzisław, within Jędrzejów County, Świętokrzyskie Voivodeship, in south-central Poland. It lies approximately 5 km (3 mi) south-west of Wodzisław, 20 km (12 mi) south-west of Jędrzejów, and 55 km (34 mi) south-west of the regional capital Kielce.
