= Helenówka, Świętokrzyskie Voivodeship =

Helenówka
- Village
- Location within Poland
- Coordinates: 50°34′40″N 20°25′2″E
- Country: Poland
- Voivodeship: Świętokrzyskie
- County: Jędrzejów
- Gmina: Imielno

Helenówka [xɛlɛˈnufka] is a village in the administrative district of Gmina Imielno, within Jędrzejów County, Świętokrzyskie Voivodeship, in south-central Poland. It lies approximately 3 km (2 mi) west of Imielno, 11 km (7 mi) south-east of Jędrzejów, and 37 km (23 mi) south-west of the regional capital Kielce.
