= Pokrzywnica, Jędrzejów County =

Pokrzywnica
- Village
- Location within Poland
- Coordinates: 50°31′55″N 20°13′51″E
- Country: Poland
- Voivodeship: Świętokrzyskie
- County: Jędrzejów
- Gmina: Wodzisław

Pokrzywnica [pɔkʂɨvˈnit͡sa] is a village in the administrative district of Gmina Wodzisław, within Jędrzejów County, Świętokrzyskie Voivodeship, in south-central Poland. It lies approximately 4 km (2 mi) north-east of Wodzisław, 13 km (8 mi) south-west of Jędrzejów, and 48 km (30 mi) south-west of the regional capital Kielce.
