= Laskowa, Świętokrzyskie Voivodeship =

Laskowa
- Village
- Location within Poland
- Coordinates: 50°31′29″N 20°12′44″E
- Country: Poland
- Voivodeship: Świętokrzyskie
- County: Jędrzejów
- Gmina: Wodzisław

Laskowa [lasˈkɔva] is a village in the administrative district of Gmina Wodzisław, within Jędrzejów County, Świętokrzyskie Voivodeship, in south-central Poland. It lies approximately 2 km (1 mi) east of Wodzisław, 14 km (9 mi) south-west of Jędrzejów, and 49 km (30 mi) south-west of the regional capital Kielce.
