= Dalechowy =

- Village
- Location within Poland
- Coordinates: 50°36′31″N 20°22′55″E
- Country: Poland
- Voivodeship: Świętokrzyskie
- County: Jędrzejów
- Gmina: Imielno
- Population: 180

Dalechowy [dalɛˈxɔvɨ] is a village in the administrative district of Gmina Imielno, within Jędrzejów County, Świętokrzyskie Voivodeship, in south-central Poland. It lies approximately 6 km (4 mi) north-west of Imielno, 7 km (4 mi) south-east of Jędrzejów, and 35 km (22 mi) south-west of the regional capital Kielce.
