= Rembiechowa =

- Village
- Location within Poland
- Coordinates: 50°44′50″N 20°12′2″E
- Country: Poland
- Voivodeship: Świętokrzyskie
- County: Jędrzejów
- Gmina: Oksa
- Population: 420

Rembiechowa [rɛmbjɛˈxɔva] is a village in the administrative district of Gmina Oksa, within Jędrzejów County, Świętokrzyskie Voivodeship, in south-central Poland. It lies approximately 8 km (5 mi) east of Oksa, 15 km (9 mi) north-west of Jędrzejów, and 33 km (21 mi) south-west of the regional capital Kielce.
