= Opatkowice Murowane =

- Village
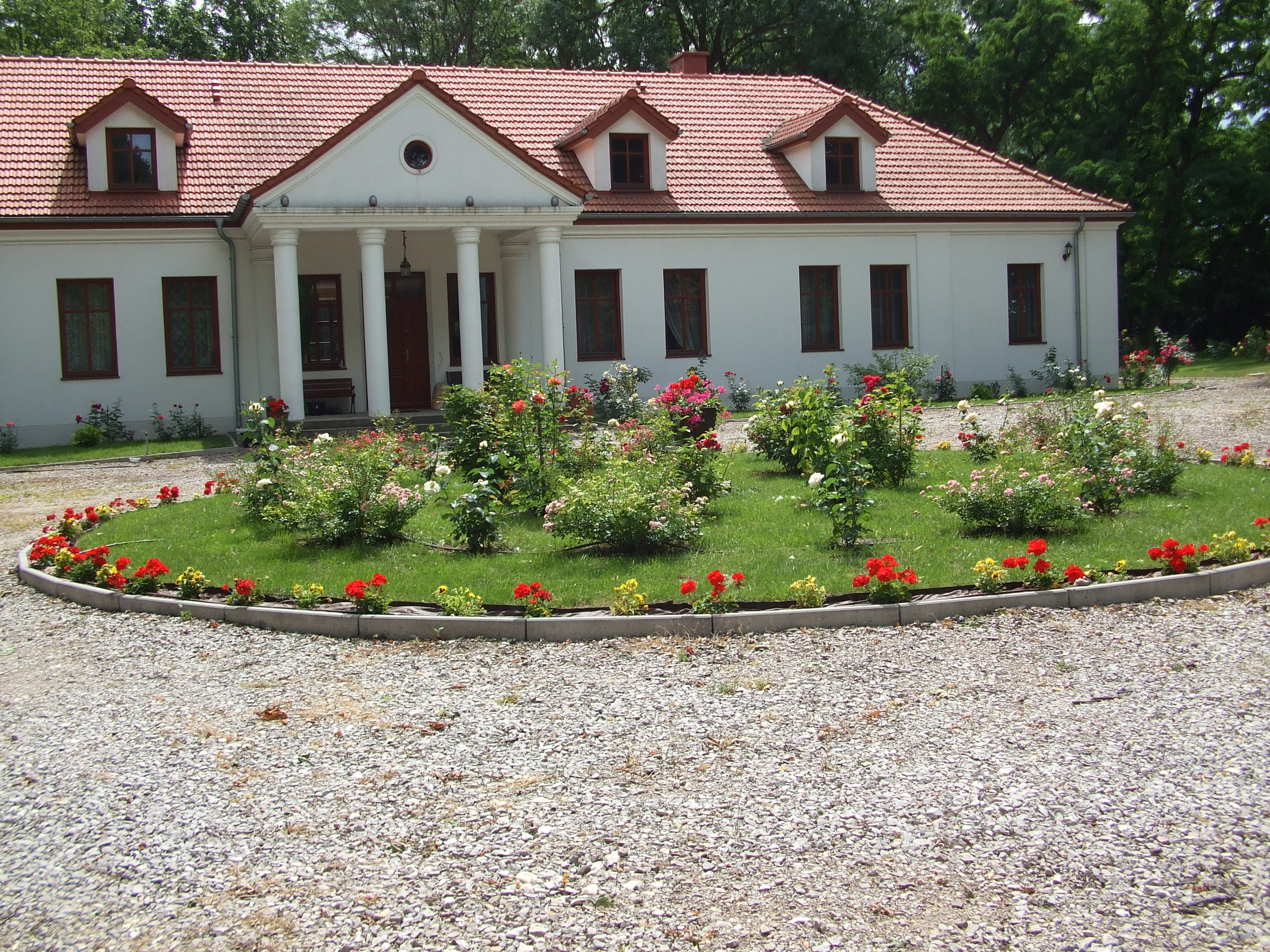
- Manor house

- Location within Poland
- Coordinates: 50°34′N 20°21′E
- Country: Poland
- Voivodeship: Świętokrzyskie
- County: Jędrzejów
- Gmina: Imielno

Opatkowice Murowane [ɔpatkɔˈvit͡sɛ murɔˈvanɛ] is a village in the administrative district of Gmina Imielno, within Jędrzejów County, Świętokrzyskie Voivodeship, in south-central Poland. It lies approximately 8 km (5 mi) west of Imielno, 9 km (6 mi) south-east of Jędrzejów, and 40 km (25 mi) south-west of the regional capital Kielce.
