= Podlesie, Jędrzejów County =

Podlesie
- Village
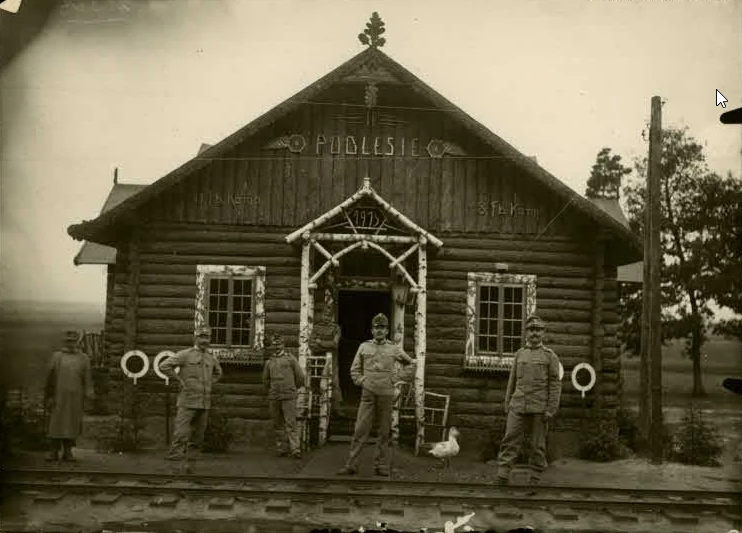
- Station of the narrow gauge military railway, 1914-1918

- Location within Poland
- Coordinates: 50°29′38″N 20°14′19″E
- Country: Poland
- Voivodeship: Świętokrzyskie
- County: Jędrzejów
- Gmina: Wodzisław

Podlesie [pɔdˈlɛɕɛ] is a village in the administrative district of Gmina Wodzisław, within Jędrzejów County, Świętokrzyskie Voivodeship, in south-central Poland. It lies approximately 5 km (3 mi) south-east of Wodzisław, 17 km (11 mi) south of Jędrzejów, and 51 km (32 mi) south-west of the regional capital Kielce.
