= Nowa Olszówka =

- Village
- Location within Poland
- Coordinates: 50°30′26″N 20°9′20″E
- Country: Poland
- Voivodeship: Świętokrzyskie
- County: Jędrzejów
- Gmina: Wodzisław

Nowa Olszówka [ˈnɔva ɔlˈʂufka] is a village in the administrative district of Gmina Wodzisław, within Jędrzejów County, Świętokrzyskie Voivodeship, in south-central Poland. It lies approximately 3 km (2 mi) south-west of Wodzisław, 18 km (11 mi) south-west of Jędrzejów, and 53 km (33 mi) south-west of the regional capital Kielce.
