= Stawy, Świętokrzyskie Voivodeship =

Stawy
- Village
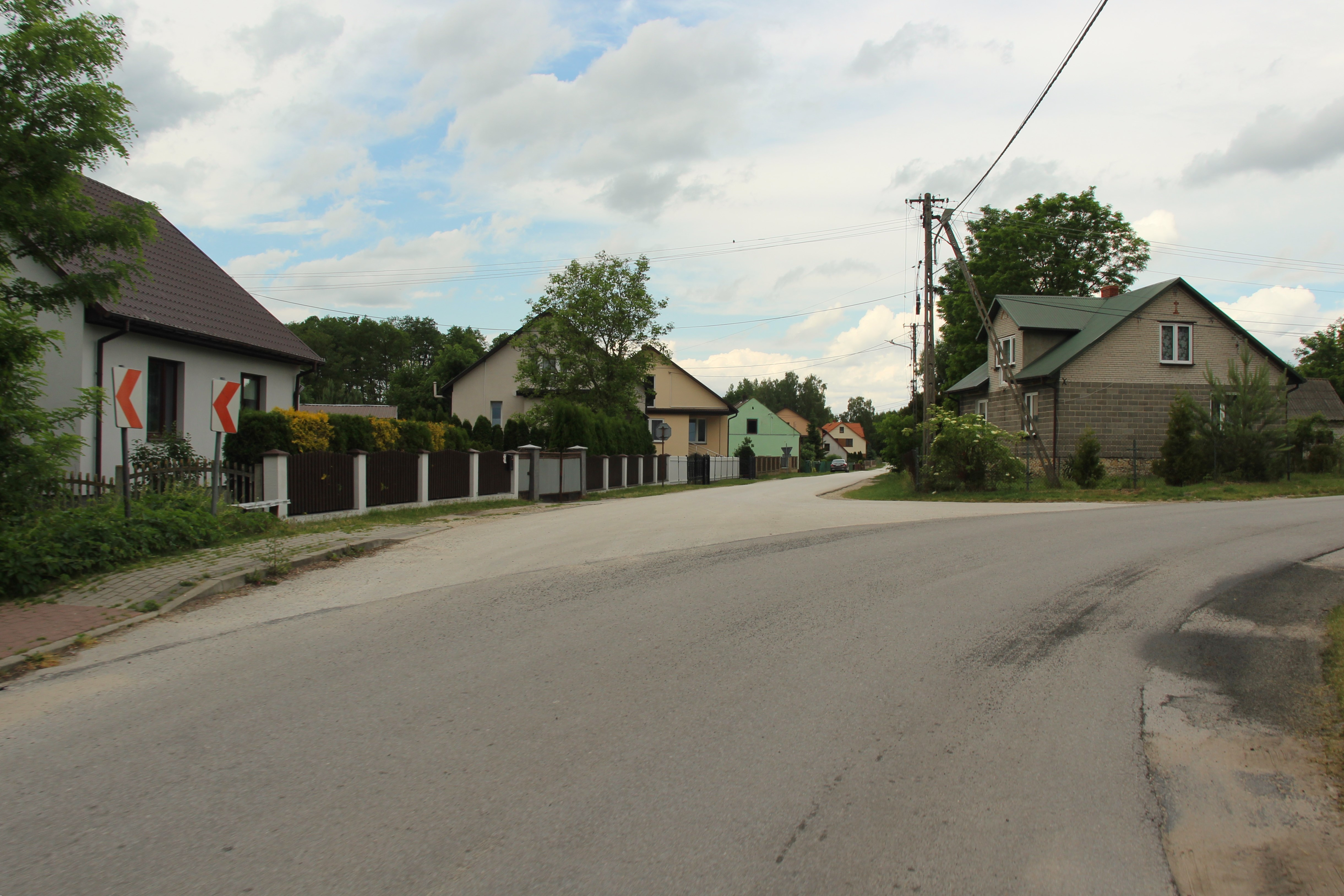

- Location within Poland
- Coordinates: 50°35′8″N 20°28′30″E
- Country: Poland
- Voivodeship: Świętokrzyskie
- County: Jędrzejów
- Gmina: Imielno

Stawy [ˈstavɨ] is a village in the administrative district of Gmina Imielno, within Jędrzejów County, Świętokrzyskie Voivodeship, in south-central Poland. It lies approximately 2 km (1 mi) east of Imielno, 14 km (9 mi) south-east of Jędrzejów, and 35 km (22 mi) south of the regional capital Kielce.
