= Stare Kanice =

- Village
- Location within Poland
- Coordinates: 50°44′14″N 20°12′54″E
- Country: Poland
- Voivodeship: Świętokrzyskie
- County: Jędrzejów
- Gmina: Oksa

Stare Kanice [ˈstarɛ kaˈnit͡sɛ] is a village in the administrative district of Gmina Oksa, within Jędrzejów County, Świętokrzyskie Voivodeship, in south-central Poland. It lies approximately 9 km (6 mi) east of Oksa, 13 km (8 mi) northwest of Jędrzejów, and 33 km (21 mi) southwest of the regional capital Kielce.
