= Mierzawa, Świętokrzyskie Voivodeship =

Mierzawa
- Village
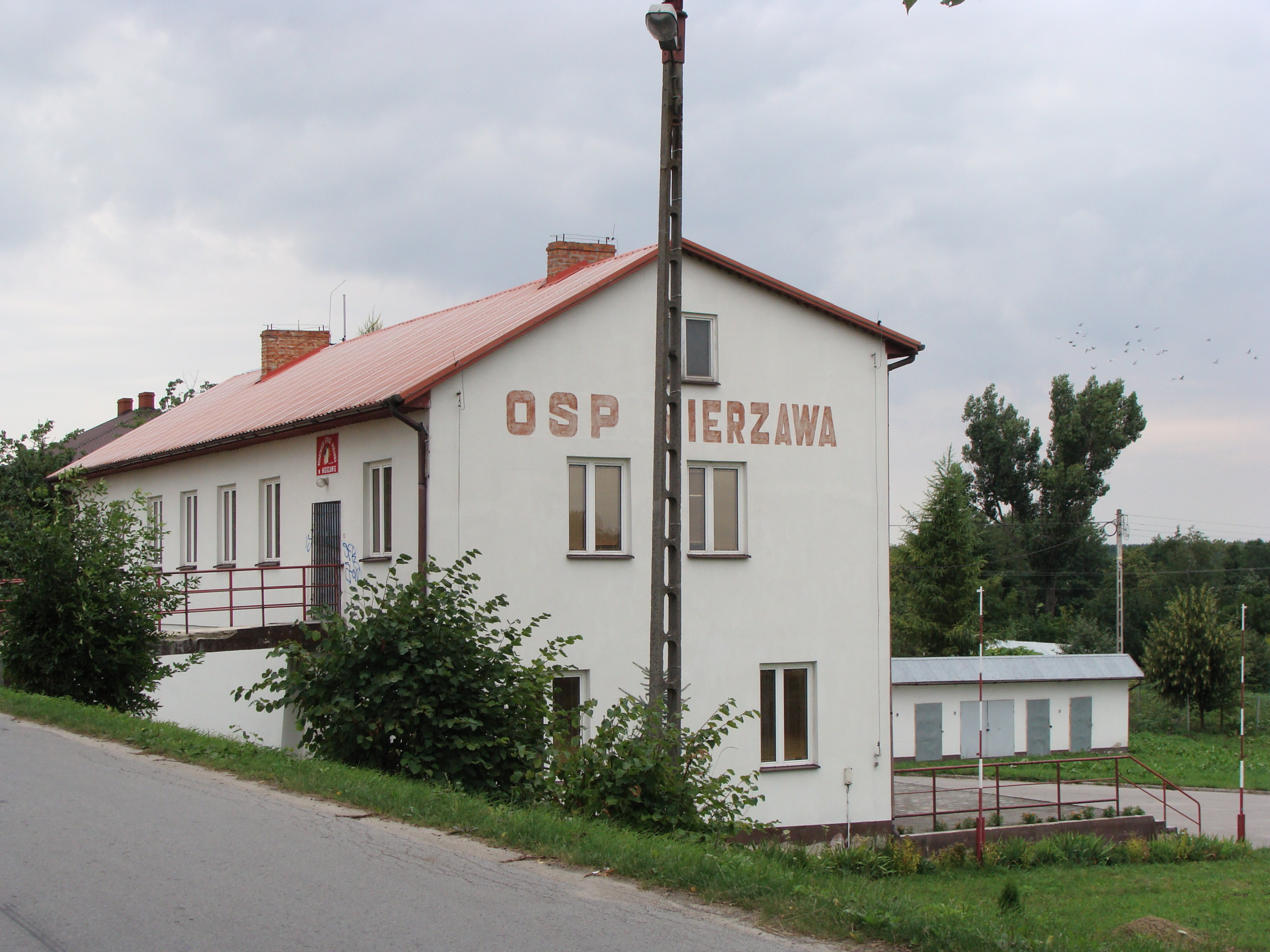
- Fire station

- Location within Poland
- Coordinates: 50°34′22″N 20°13′26″E
- Country: Poland
- Voivodeship: Świętokrzyskie
- County: Jędrzejów
- Gmina: Wodzisław
- Population (approx.): 300

Mierzawa [mjɛˈʐava] is a village in the administrative district of Gmina Wodzisław, within Jędrzejów County, Świętokrzyskie Voivodeship, in south-central Poland. It lies approximately 7 km (4 mi) north of Wodzisław, 9 km (6 mi) south-west of Jędrzejów, and 45 km (28 mi) south-west of the regional capital Kielce.
