= Karczunek, Świętokrzyskie Voivodeship =

Karczunek
- Village
- Location within Poland
- Coordinates: 50°35′54″N 20°22′22″E
- Country: Poland
- Voivodeship: Świętokrzyskie
- County: Jędrzejów
- Gmina: Imielno
- Population: 110

Karczunek [karˈt͡ʂunɛk] is a village in the administrative district of Gmina Imielno, within Jędrzejów County, Świętokrzyskie Voivodeship, in south-central Poland. It lies approximately 6 km (4 mi) west of Imielno, 7 km (4 mi) south-east of Jędrzejów, and 36 km (22 mi) south-west of the regional capital Kielce.
