= Przezwody, Jędrzejów County =

Przezwody
- Village
- Location within Poland
- Coordinates: 50°28′3″N 20°19′26″E
- Country: Poland
- Voivodeship: Świętokrzyskie
- County: Jędrzejów
- Gmina: Wodzisław

Przezwody [pʂɛzˈvɔdɨ] is a village in the administrative district of Gmina Wodzisław, within Jędrzejów County, Świętokrzyskie Voivodeship, in south-central Poland. It lies approximately 12 km (7 mi) south-east of Wodzisław, 19 km (12 mi) south of Jędrzejów, and 51 km (32 mi) south-west of the regional capital Kielce.
