= Węgleszyn-Ogrody =

- Village
- Location within Poland
- Coordinates: 50°44′57″N 20°09′16″E
- Country: Poland
- Voivodeship: Świętokrzyskie
- County: Jędrzejów
- Gmina: Oksa

Węgleszyn-Ogrody [vɛŋˈɡlɛʂɨn ɔˈɡrɔdɨ] is a village in the administrative district of Gmina Oksa, within Jędrzejów County, Świętokrzyskie Voivodeship, in south-central Poland.
