= Opatkowice Cysterskie =

- Village
- Location within Poland
- Coordinates: 50°33′06″N 20°21′28″E
- Country: Poland
- Voivodeship: Świętokrzyskie
- County: Jędrzejów
- Gmina: Imielno

Opatkowice Cysterskie [ɔpatkɔˈvit͡sɛ t͡sɨsˈtɛrskʲɛ] is a village in the administrative district of Gmina Imielno, within Jędrzejów County, Świętokrzyskie Voivodeship, in south-central Poland.
