= Września (disambiguation) =

Września may refer to the following places:

- Września in Greater Poland Voivodeship (west-central Poland)
- Września, Masovian Voivodeship (east-central Poland)
- Września, Świętokrzyskie Voivodeship (south-central Poland)
