= Tyniec-Kolonia =

- Village
- Location within Poland
- Coordinates: 50°42′45″N 20°11′08″E
- Country: Poland
- Voivodeship: Świętokrzyskie
- County: Jędrzejów
- Gmina: Oksa

Tyniec-Kolonia [ˈtɨɲɛt͡s ˈkɔlɔnia] is a village in the administrative district of Gmina Oksa, within Jędrzejów County, Świętokrzyskie Voivodeship, in south-central Poland.
