= Mierzwin =

Mierzwin may refer to the following places in Poland:

- Mierzwin, Lower Silesian Voivodeship (south-west Poland)
- Mierzwin, Kuyavian-Pomeranian Voivodeship (north-central Poland)
- Mierzwin, Świętokrzyskie Voivodeship (south-central Poland)
