= Promyk =

- Village
- Location within Poland
- Coordinates: 50°34′N 20°10′E
- Country: Poland
- Voivodeship: Świętokrzyskie
- County: Jędrzejów
- Gmina: Wodzisław

Promyk [ˈprɔmɨk] is a village in the administrative district of Gmina Wodzisław, within Jędrzejów County, Świętokrzyskie Voivodeship, in south-central Poland.
