= Sadki =

Sadki may refer to:

- Sadki, Kuyavian-Pomeranian Voivodeship, a village in north-central Poland
- Sadki, Subcarpathian Voivodeship, a village in south-east Poland
- Sadki, Świętokrzyskie Voivodeship, a village in south-central Poland
- Sadki, Moscow Oblast, a village in Moscow Oblast, Russia
- Sadki, Nizhny Novgorod Oblast, a village in Nizhny Novgorod Oblast, Russia
- Sadki, name of several other rural localities in Russia
- Sadky, Sumy Raion, Sumy Oblast, Ukraine
