= Bełk, Świętokrzyskie Voivodeship =

Bełk
- Village
- Location within Poland
- Coordinates: 50°33′0″N 20°25′7″E
- Country: Poland
- Voivodeship: Świętokrzyskie
- County: Jędrzejów
- Gmina: Imielno

Bełk [bɛu̯k] is a village in the administrative district of Gmina Imielno, within Jędrzejów County, Świętokrzyskie Voivodeship, in south-central Poland. It lies approximately 5 km (3 mi) south-west of Imielno, 13 km (8 mi) south-east of Jędrzejów, and 40 km (25 mi) south of the regional capital Kielce.
