= Olbrachcice, Świętokrzyskie Voivodeship =

Olbrachcice
- Village
- Location within Poland
- Coordinates: 50°33′23″N 20°17′22″E
- Country: Poland
- Voivodeship: Świętokrzyskie
- County: Jędrzejów
- Gmina: Wodzisław

Olbrachcice [ɔlbraxˈt͡ɕit͡sɛ] is a village in the administrative district of Gmina Wodzisław, within Jędrzejów County, Świętokrzyskie Voivodeship, in south-central Poland. It lies approximately 9 km (6 mi) north-east of Wodzisław, 9 km (6 mi) south of Jędrzejów, and 43 km (27 mi) south-west of the regional capital Kielce. The distance from Olbrachcice to Warsaw, the capital of Poland, is roughly 310 km (193 mi).
