= Przezwody =

Przezwody may refer to the following places:

- Przezwody, Lesser Poland Voivodeship (south Poland)
- Przezwody, Jędrzejów County in Świętokrzyskie Voivodeship (south-central Poland)
- Przezwody, Sandomierz County in Świętokrzyskie Voivodeship (south-central Poland)
