= Rzeszówek, Świętokrzyskie Voivodeship =

Rzeszówek
- Village
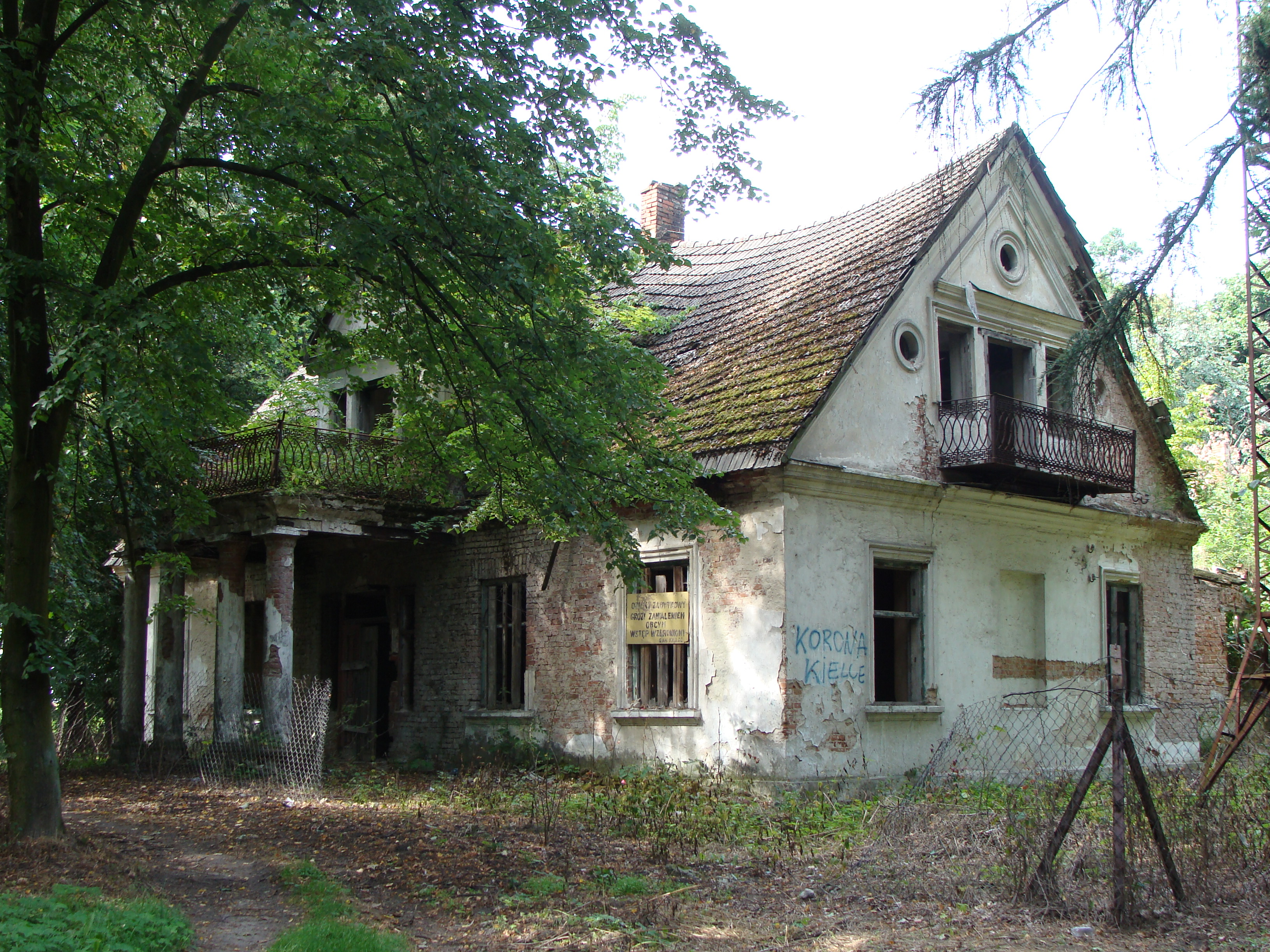
- Manor house

- Location within Poland
- Coordinates: 50°44′28″N 20°4′26″E
- Country: Poland
- Voivodeship: Świętokrzyskie
- County: Jędrzejów
- Gmina: Oksa
- Population (approx.): 220

Rzeszówek [ʐɛˈʂuvɛk] is a village in the administrative district of Gmina Oksa, within Jędrzejów County, Świętokrzyskie Voivodeship, in south-central Poland. It lies approximately 3 km (2 mi) north-west of Oksa, 20 km (12 mi) north-west of Jędrzejów, and 42 km (26 mi) south-west of the regional capital Kielce.
