= Karczunek =

Karczunek may refer to the following places:

- Karczunek, Chełm County in Lublin Voivodeship (east Poland)
- Karczunek, Puławy County in Lublin Voivodeship (east Poland)
- Karczunek, Otwock County (east-central Poland)
- Karczunek, Świętokrzyskie Voivodeship (south-central Poland)
- Karczunek, Warsaw (east-central Poland)
