= Zegartowice =

Zegartowice may refer to the following places:

- Zegartowice, Kuyavian-Pomeranian Voivodeship (north-central Poland)
- Zegartowice, Lesser Poland Voivodeship (south Poland)
- Zegartowice, Świętokrzyskie Voivodeship (south-central Poland)
