= Borszowice, Gmina Imielno =

Borszowice
- Village
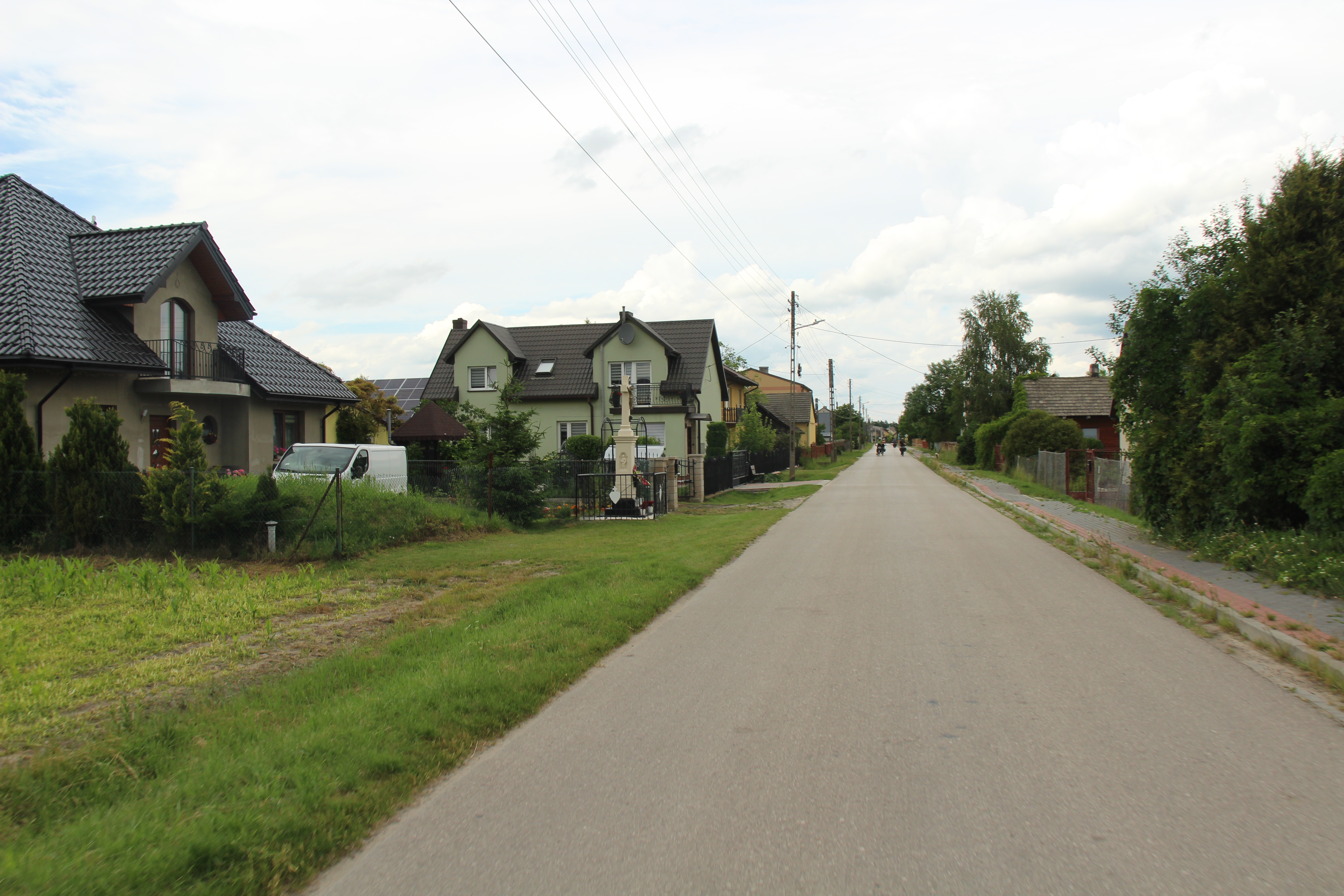

- Location within Poland
- Coordinates: 50°37′50″N 20°29′20″E
- Country: Poland
- Voivodeship: Świętokrzyskie
- County: Jędrzejów
- Gmina: Imielno

Borszowice [bɔrʂɔˈvit͡sɛ] is a village in the administrative district of Gmina Imielno, within Jędrzejów County, Świętokrzyskie Voivodeship, in south-central Poland. It lies approximately 6 km (4 mi) north-east of Imielno, 14 km (9 mi) east of Jędrzejów, and 30 km (19 mi) south of the regional capital Kielce.
