= Łany, Jędrzejów County =

Łany
- Village
- Location within Poland
- Coordinates: 50°31′32″N 20°10′24″E
- Country: Poland
- Voivodeship: Świętokrzyskie
- County: Jędrzejów
- Gmina: Wodzisław

Łany [ˈwanɨ] is a village in the administrative district of Gmina Wodzisław, within Jędrzejów County, Świętokrzyskie Voivodeship, in south-central Poland. It lies approximately 2 km (1 mi) north-west of Wodzisław, 15 km (9 mi) south-west of Jędrzejów, and 51 km (32 mi) south-west of the regional capital Kielce.
