= Świątniki =

Świątniki may refer to the following places in Poland:

- Świątniki, Trzebnica County in Lower Silesian Voivodeship (south-west Poland)
- Świątniki, Wrocław County in Lower Silesian Voivodeship (south-west Poland)
- Świątniki, Radziejów County in Kuyavian-Pomeranian Voivodeship (central Poland)
- Świątniki, Włocławek County in Kuyavian-Pomeranian Voivodeship (central Poland)
- Świątniki, Pabianice County in Łódź Voivodeship (central Poland)
- Świątniki, Piotrków County in Łódź Voivodeship (central Poland)
- Świątniki, Jędrzejów County in Świętokrzyskie Voivodeship (south Poland)
- Świątniki, Sandomierz County in Świętokrzyskie Voivodeship (south-central Poland)
- Świątniki, Konin County in Greater Poland Voivodeship (west-central Poland)
- Świątniki, Poznań County in Greater Poland Voivodeship (west-central Poland)
