= Łany =

Łany may refer to the following places in Poland:

- Łany, Lower Silesian Voivodeship (south-west Poland)
- Łany, Krasnystaw County in Lublin Voivodeship (east Poland)
- Łany, Kraśnik County in Lublin Voivodeship (east Poland)
- Łany, Puławy County in Lublin Voivodeship (east Poland)
- Łany, Jędrzejów County in Świętokrzyskie Voivodeship (south-central Poland)
- Łany, Opatów County in Świętokrzyskie Voivodeship (south-central Poland)
- Łany, Silesian Voivodeship (south Poland)
- Łany, Opole Voivodeship (south-west Poland)
- Łany, West Pomeranian Voivodeship (north-west Poland)
