= Bełk =

Bełk may refer to the following places:

- Bełk, Silesian Voivodeship (south Poland)
- Bełk, Świętokrzyskie Voivodeship (south-central Poland)
- Bełk, Warmian-Masurian Voivodeship (north Poland)
- Belk, Alabama
- Belk, Tennessee
