= Rzeszówek =

Rzeszówek may refer to the following places in Poland:

- Rzeszówek, Lower Silesian Voivodeship (south-west Poland)
- Rzeszówek, Świętokrzyskie Voivodeship (south-central Poland)
