= Zegartowice, Świętokrzyskie Voivodeship =

Zegartowice
- Village
- Location within Poland
- Coordinates: 50°33′20″N 20°23′46″E
- Country: Poland
- Voivodeship: Świętokrzyskie
- County: Jędrzejów
- Gmina: Imielno

Zegartowice [zɛɡartɔˈvit͡sɛ] is a village in the administrative district of Gmina Imielno, within Jędrzejów County, Świętokrzyskie Voivodeship, in south-central Poland. It lies approximately 5 km (3 mi) south-west of Imielno, 11 km (7 mi) south-east of Jędrzejów, and 40 km (25 mi) south-west of the regional capital Kielce.
