= Motkowice =

- Village
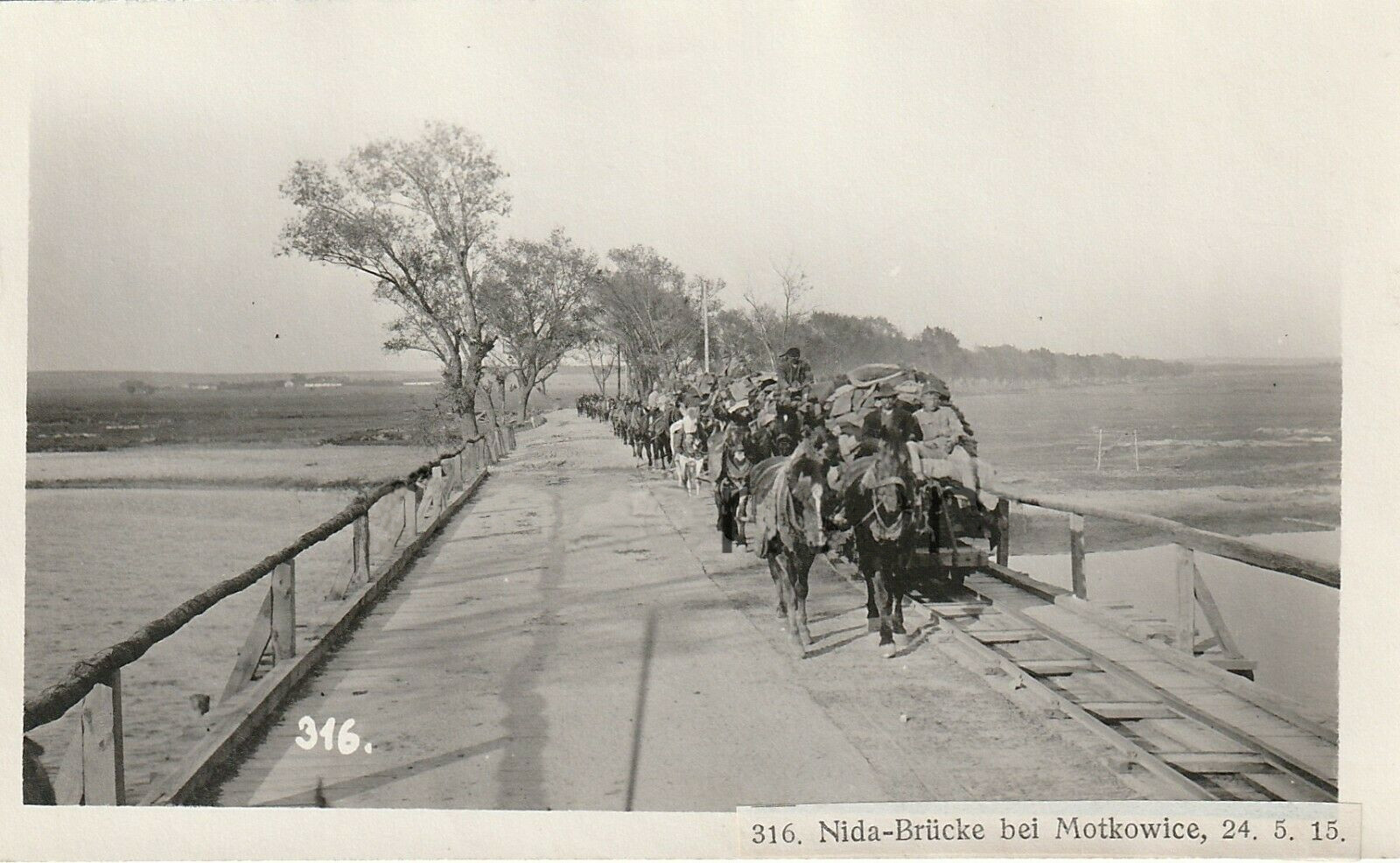
- Nida bridge in Motkowice with horse-drawn, k.u.k, narrow gauge railway, 24 May 1915

- Location within Poland
- Coordinates: 50°36′5″N 20°29′13″E
- Country: Poland
- Voivodeship: Świętokrzyskie
- County: Jędrzejów
- Gmina: Imielno

Motkowice [mɔtkɔˈvit͡sɛ] is a village in the administrative district of Gmina Imielno, within Jędrzejów County, Świętokrzyskie Voivodeship, in south-central Poland. It lies approximately 4 km (2 mi) north-east of Imielno, 14 km (9 mi) east of Jędrzejów, and 33 km (21 mi) south of the regional capital Kielce.
