= Wola Lubecka, Świętokrzyskie Voivodeship =

Wola Lubecka
- Village
- Location within Poland
- Coordinates: 50°29′N 20°20′E
- Country: Poland
- Voivodeship: Świętokrzyskie
- County: Jędrzejów
- Gmina: Wodzisław
- Population: 180

Wola Lubecka [ˈvɔla luˈbɛt͡ska] is a village in the administrative district of Gmina Wodzisław, within Jędrzejów County, Świętokrzyskie Voivodeship, in south-central Poland. It lies approximately 11 km (7 mi) east of Wodzisław, 17 km (11 mi) south of Jędrzejów, and 49 km (30 mi) south-west of the regional capital Kielce.
