= Olbrachcice =

Olbrachcice may refer to:

- Polish name for Albrechtice (Karviná District) in the Czech Republic
- Olbrachcice, Świętokrzyskie Voivodeship (south-central Poland)
- Olbrachcice, Masovian Voivodeship (east-central Poland)
- Olbrachcice, Silesian Voivodeship (south Poland)
- Olbrachcice, Lubusz Voivodeship (west Poland)
- Olbrachcice, Opole Voivodeship (south-west Poland)
