= Rajchotka =

- Village
- Location within Poland
- Coordinates: 50°35′52″N 20°23′34″E
- Country: Poland
- Voivodeship: Świętokrzyskie
- County: Jędrzejów
- Gmina: Imielno

Rajchotka [rai̯ˈxɔtka] is a village in the administrative district of Gmina Imielno, within Jędrzejów County, Świętokrzyskie Voivodeship, in south-central Poland.
