= Borszowice =

Borszowice refers to the following places in Poland:

- Borszowice, Gmina Imielno
- Borszowice, Gmina Sędziszów
