= Lubecki =

Lubecki (femine: Lubecka, plural: Lubeccy) is a Polish surname; it may refer to:

- Franciszek Ksawery Drucki-Lubecki (1778–1846), Polish politician, minister of the treasury in the Congress Kingdom of Poland
- Daniel Lubetzky (born 1968), Mexican American billionaire businessman
- Seymour Lubetzky (1898–2003) was a major cataloging theorist

== Other ==
- Wola Lubecka, Lesser Poland Voivodeship, Poland
- Wola Lubecka, Świętokrzyskie Voivodeship, Poland
