= Belk (surname) =

Belk is an English surname. Notable people with this surname include:

- Bill Belk (born 1946), American football defensive lineman
- Darren Belk, English songwriter, bassist, and guitarist
- Habib Belk (born 1989), Moroccan gnawa singer, songwriter, and multi-instrumentalist
- Irwin Belk (1922–2018), American businessman and politician
- J. Blanton Belk, Up With People founder and chairman emeritus
- John M. Belk (1920–2007), head of a department store chain
- Mary Gardner Belk (born 1956), politician
- Paul Belk (born 1977), former competitive swimmer
- Rocky Belk (1960–2010), American football wide receiver
- Russell W. Belk, American business academic
- Tim Belk (born 1970), baseball player
