= Sadki, Świętokrzyskie Voivodeship =

Village in Gmina Wodzisław, Poland

Sadki
- Village
- Location within Poland
- Coordinates: 50°28′16″N 20°15′17″E
- Country: Poland
- Voivodeship: Świętokrzyskie
- County: Jędrzejów
- Gmina: Wodzisław

Sadki [ˈsatki] is a village in the administrative district of Gmina Wodzisław, within Jędrzejów County, Świętokrzyskie Voivodeship, in south-central Poland.
