= Świątniki, Jędrzejów County =

Świątniki
- Village
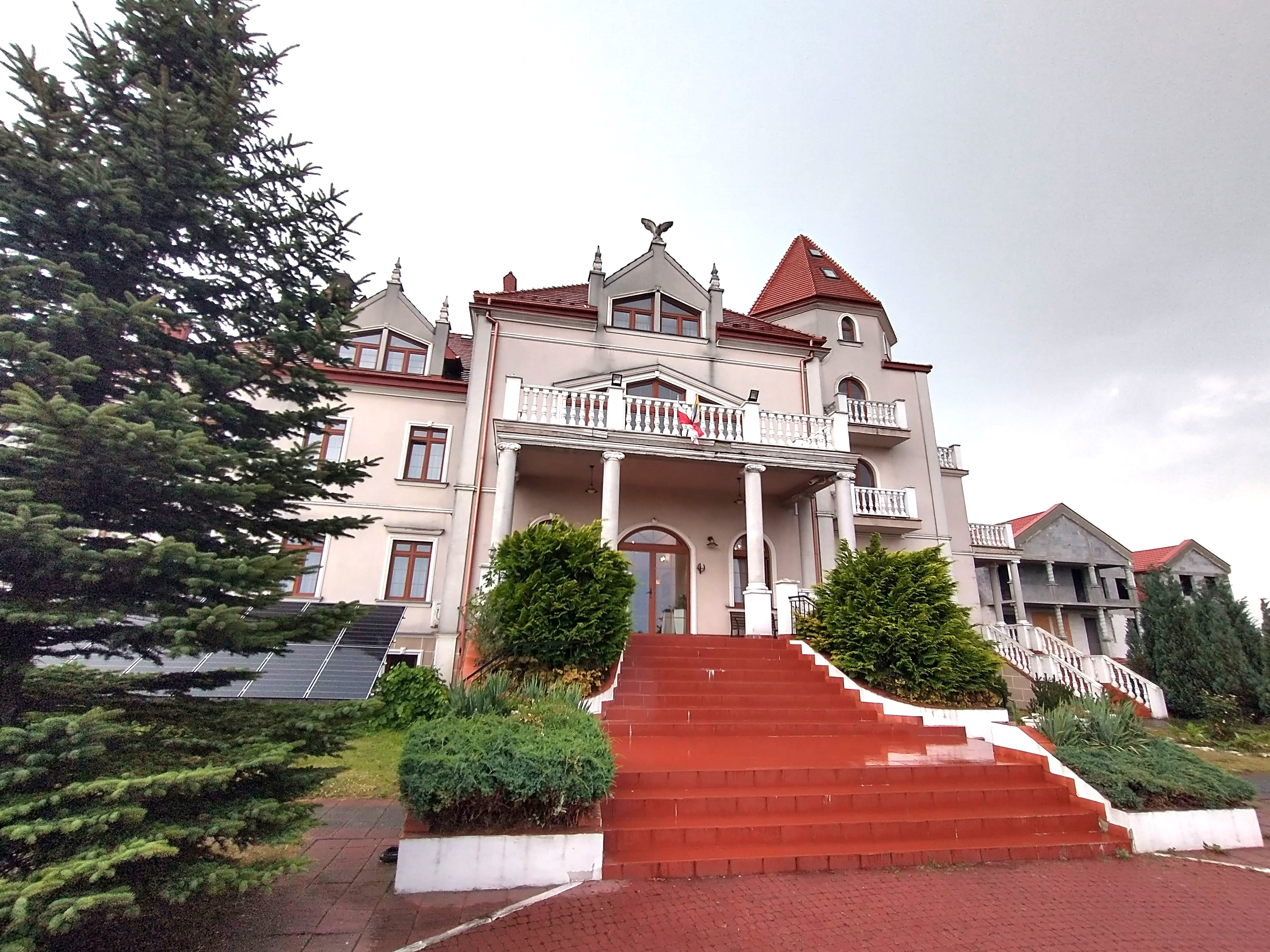

- Location within Poland
- Coordinates: 50°30′54″N 20°11′22″E
- Country: Poland
- Voivodeship: Świętokrzyskie
- County: Jędrzejów
- Gmina: Wodzisław

Świątniki (Polish pronunciation: [ɕfjɔntˈɲikʲi]) is a village in the administrative district of Gmina Wodzisław, within Jędrzejów County, Świętokrzyskie Voivodeship, in south-central Poland.
