= Gmina Imielno =

Gmina Imielno Imielno Commune
- Gmina
- Coat of arms
- Interactive map of Gmina Imielno
- Coordinates (Imielno): 50°35′7″N 20°26′56″E
- Country: Poland
- Voivodeship: Świętokrzyskie
- County: Jędrzejów
- Seat: Imielno

Area
  - Total: 100.6 km^{2} (38.8 sq mi)

Population (2006)
  - Total: 4,626
  - Density: 45.98/km^{2} (119.1/sq mi)

Gmina Imielno is a rural gmina (administrative district) in Jędrzejów County, Świętokrzyskie Voivodeship, in south-central Poland. Its seat is the village of Imielno, which lies approximately 12 kilometres (7 mi) south-east of Jędrzejów and 36 km (22 mi) south of the regional capital Kielce.

The gmina covers an area of 100.6 square kilometres (38.8 sq mi), and as of 2006 its total population is 4,626.

The gmina contains part of the protected area called Nida Landscape Park.

== Villages ==
Gmina Imielno contains the villages and settlements of Bełk, Borszowice, Dalechowy, Dzierszyn, Grudzyny, Helenówka, Imielnica, Imielno, Jakubów, Karczunek, Kawęczyn, Mierzwin, Motkowice, Opatkowice Cysterskie, Opatkowice Drewniane, Opatkowice Murowane, Opatkowice Pojałowskie, Rajchotka, Sobowice, Stawy, Wygoda and Zegartowice.

== Neighbouring gminas ==
Gmina Imielno is bordered by the gminas of Jędrzejów, Kije, Michałów, Pińczów and Sobków.
