= Gmina Wodzisław =

Gmina Wodzisław Wodzisław Commune
- Gmina
- Coat of arms
- Interactive map of Gmina Wodzisław
- Coordinates (Wodzisław): 50°31′12″N 20°11′26″E
- Country: Poland
- Voivodeship: Świętokrzyskie
- County: Jędrzejów
- Seat: Wodzisław

Area
  - Total: 176.66 km^{2} (68.21 sq mi)

Population (2006)
  - Total: 7,585
  - Density: 42.94/km^{2} (111.2/sq mi)

Gmina Wodzisław is a rural gmina (administrative district) in Jędrzejów County, Świętokrzyskie Voivodeship, in south-central Poland. Its seat is the village of Wodzisław, which lies approximately 15 kilometres (9 mi) south-west of Jędrzejów and 51 km (32 mi) south-west of the regional capital Kielce.

The gmina covers an area of 176.66 square kilometres (68.2 sq mi), and as of 2006 its total population is 7,585.

== Villages ==
Gmina Wodzisław contains the villages and settlements of Brzeście, Brzezinki, Dębiany, Droblin, Folga Pierwsza, Jeziorki, Judasze, Kaziny, Klemencice, Konary, Kowalów Dolny, Kowalów Górny, Krężoły, Łany, Laskowa, Lubcza, Ludwinów, Mieronice, Mierzawa, Nawarzyce, Niegosławice, Nowa Olszówka, Olbrachcice, Pękosław, Piotrkowice, Podlesie, Pokrzywnica, Promyk, Przezwody, Przyłęczek, Przyłęk, Przyrąb, Sadki, Sielec, Stara Olszówka, Strzeszkowice, Świątniki, Wodacz, Wodzisław, Wola Lubecka, Września and Zarzecze.

== Neighbouring gminas ==
Gmina Wodzisław is bordered by the gminas of Działoszyce, Jędrzejów, Kozłów, Książ Wielki, Michałów and Sędziszów.
