= Września, Świętokrzyskie Voivodeship =

Września
- Village
- Location within Poland
- Coordinates: 50°34′30″N 20°16′36″E
- Country: Poland
- Voivodeship: Świętokrzyskie
- County: Jędrzejów
- Gmina: Wodzisław

Września [ˈvʐɛɕɲa] is a village in the administrative district of Gmina Wodzisław, within Jędrzejów County, Świętokrzyskie Voivodeship, in south-central Poland.
