= Gmina Oksa =

Gmina Oksa Oksa Commune
- Gmina
- Coat of arms
- Interactive map of Gmina Oksa
- Coordinates (Oksa): 50°43′43″N 20°6′2″E
- Country: Poland
- Voivodeship: Świętokrzyskie
- County: Jędrzejów
- Seat: Oksa

Area
  - Total: 90.26 km^{2} (34.85 sq mi)

Population (2006)
  - Total: 4,879
  - Density: 54.05/km^{2} (140.0/sq mi)

Gmina Oksa is a rural gmina (administrative district) in Jędrzejów County, Świętokrzyskie Voivodeship, in south-central Poland. Its seat is the village of Oksa, which lies approximately 18 kilometres (11 mi) north-west of Jędrzejów and 41 km (25 mi) south-west of the regional capital Kielce.

The gmina covers an area of 90.26 square kilometres (34.8 sq mi), and as of 2006 its total population is 4,879.

== Villages ==
Gmina Oksa contains the villages and settlements of Błogoszów, Lipno, Nowe Kanice, Oksa, Pawęzów, Popowice, Rembiechowa, Rzeszówek, Stare Kanice, Tyniec, Tyniec-Wieś, Węgleszyn, Węgleszyn-Dębina, Węgleszyn-Ogrody, Zakrzów and Zalesie.

== Neighbouring gminas ==
Gmina Oksa is bordered by the gminas of Jędrzejów, Małogoszcz, Nagłowice, Radków and Włoszczowa.
