= Paul Belk =

British swimmer

Personal information
- Full name: Paul Adam Belk
- National team: Great Britain
- Born: 12 June 1977 (age 49)
- Height: 1.93 m (6 ft 4 in)
- Weight: 88 kg (194 lb; 13.9 st)

Sport
- Sport: Swimming
- Strokes: Freestyle
Medal record
Men's swimming
Representing Great Britain
World Championships (SC)
Bronze medal – third place	2000 Athens	4x100 m freestyle
Universiade
Gold medal – first place	2001 Beijing	4x100 m freestyle

Paul Adam Belk (born 12 June 1977) is a British former competitive swimmer who swam in the 2000 Summer Olympics in Sydney, Australia. Belk competed for the British men's team in the preliminary heats of the 4x100-metre freestyle relay.

Immediately prior to the 2000 Olympics, Belk swam in the 2000 FINA Short Course World Championships in Athens, winning a bronze medal in the 4x100-metre freestyle relay. The following year as the 2001 World University Games in Beijing, he was a member of the first-place British team in the men's 4x100-metre freestyle relay.
