= Semyon Khokhryakov =

Hero of the Soviet Union

Semyon Vasilyevich Khokhryakov
- Семён Васильевич Хохряков
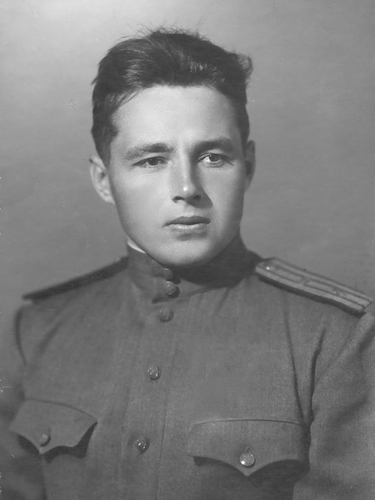
- Born: 31 December [O.S. 18 December] 1915; Kolega village, Troitsky Uyezd, Orenburg Governorate, Russian Empire
- Died: 17 April 1945 (aged 29) near Cottbus, Bradenburg, Nazi Germany
- Spouse: Anna Ivanovna Butylkina
- Military career
- Allegiance: Soviet Union
- Branch: Red Army
- Service years: 1937–1945
- Rank: Major
- Commands: 209th Tank Battalion
- Conflicts: Battles of Khalkhin Gol; World War II †
- Awards: Hero of the Soviet Union (twice)

Semyon Vasilyevich Khokhryakov (Russian: Семён Васильевич Хохряков; 31 December [O.S. 18 December] 1915 – 17 April 1945) was a T-34 tank battalion commander during World War II who was twice awarded the title Hero of the Soviet Union.

== Early life ==
Khokhryakov was born on 31 December [O.S. 18 December] 1915 to a Russian peasant family in the village of Koelga. He was orphaned at a young age after his father was killed in the Russian Civil War and his mother died soon afterward. He and his sisters were then raised by their grandfather, but after the man's death the children were sent to an orphanage. Upon completing his initial schooling in 1931, Khokhryakov attended trade school and trained as an electrician and mechanic until 1934. From then until being drafted into the military in 1937 he worked at a mine in Kopeysk.

== Military career ==
Once in the Red Army he was stationed in the Kiev Military District, and after graduating from tank school he became the deputy political officer of the 60th Separate Reconnaissance Battalion in 1938. In September that year he entered the Lenin Military-Political Academy, which he graduated from in 1939. As a junior political officer he was made a deputy squadron commander of political affairs of the 1st Army Group in May, and was soon sent to Mongolia to fight Japan in Khalkhin Gol. For his actions in the conflict he was awarded the Soviet Medal for Courage and the Mongolian Order of the Polar Star. That year he became a member of the Communist Party, and before the start of 1940 he was a regimental political department instructor. In May 1941 he graduated from the M. V. Frunze Military Academy and made deputy commander of a tank battalion within the 109th Tank Regiment.

=== World War II ===
The month after graduating from the academy he experienced his baptism by fire in the Second World War. Initially taking part in the defensive operations on the South-Western Front, he was transferred to the 21st Army of the Western Front in early July. There he was involved in counterattacks in the defense of Smolensk and Bobruisk. Transferred again, he became the deputy commander of the 117th Tank Battalion on the Western Front in August, and formally promoted to the rank of political officer in September. After success in the Battle of Moscow he was wounded near Velizh in May 1942, but was able to return to his battalion upon recovery. That year he was promoted to the rank major. Having requested to switch from political instruction to a direct combat post, he was assigned to a tank battalion and later company until August 1943. Shortly after graduating from command staff training at the Molotov Armored School in December he was given command of the 209th Tank Battalion of the 54th Guards Tank Brigade of the 7th Guards Tank Corps. During his tenure the battalion took part in successful offensives against the Axis in Ukraine and Poland; officially, the tank crews under his command took out four tanks, six mortars, five cars, four anti-tank rifles, took 26 prisoners, and killed over 100 enemy combatants during two weeks in March, starting on 4 March 1944. On 18 March 1944 he was wounded, but on 24 May 1944 he was awarded the title Hero of the Soviet Union.

After recovering he was able to participate in the Vistula-Oder offensive, during which he unit advanced for over 200 kilometers to Poland in January 1945, resulting in the expulsion of the Axis from the city of Częstochowa. In that battle, the Red Army was able to take out a large amount of German equipment with relatively few losses. He was nominated to receive the title Hero of the Soviet Union a second time for his actions in the city as well as in the crossings of the Nida, Pilica, and Warta. Officially declared a Hero of the Soviet Union on 10 April 1945, he was killed in action roughly 100 kilometers from Berlin near Cottbus before he received his award in person. On the morning of 17 April 1945, his advancing tank was ambushed. Wounded, Khokhryakov approached a nearby tank for assistance but was killed by an exploding shell. He was buried in Vasilkov, in Kiev oblast.

== Awards ==
- Twice Hero of the Soviet Union (24 May 1944 and 10 April 1945)
- Order of Lenin (24 May 1944)
- Medal "For Courage" (1939)
- Order of the Polar Star (1939)

== See also ==
- Aleksandr Golovachev
- David Dragunsky
- Zakhar Slyusarenko
