= Belk, Tennessee =

Unincorporated community in Tennessee, US

Coordinates: 35°50′33″N 85°41′58″W

Belk is an unincorporated community in DeKalb County, in the U.S. state of Tennessee.

== History ==
A post office was established at Belk in 1893, and remained in operation until it was discontinued in 1908. The name Belk was the maiden name of the first postmaster's wife.
