= Oksa =

- Village
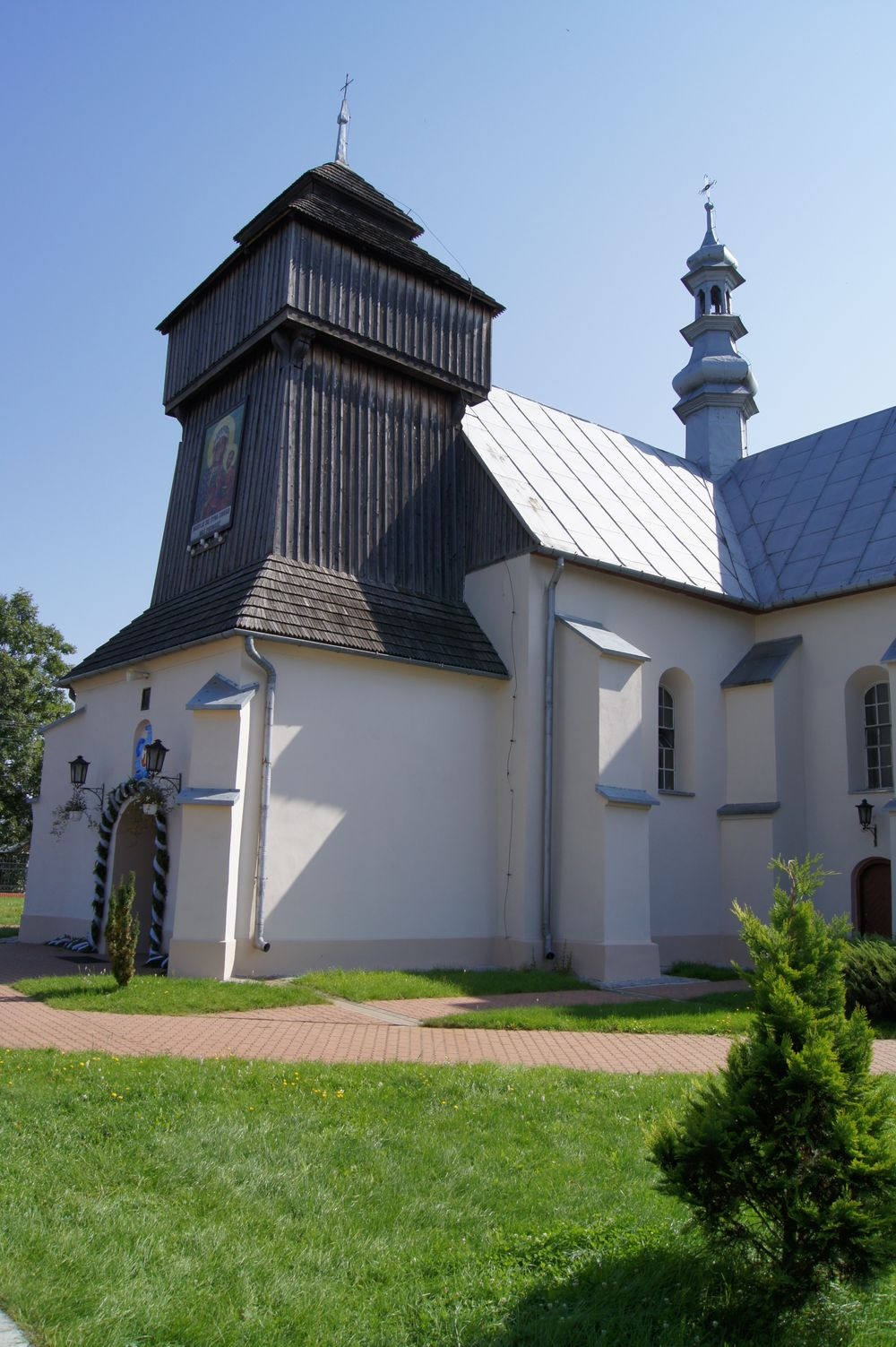
- Church of Immaculate Conception and Saint Nicholas

- Coat of arms

- Location within Poland
- Coordinates: 50°43′43″N 20°6′2″E
- Country: Poland
- Voivodeship: Świętokrzyskie
- County: Jędrzejów
- Gmina: Oksa

Population (approx.)
  - Total: 890

Oksa [ˈɔksa] is a village in Jędrzejów County, Świętokrzyskie Voivodeship, in south-central Poland. It is the seat of the gmina (administrative district) called Gmina Oksa. It lies approximately 18 km (11 mi) north-west of Jędrzejów and 41 km (25 mi) south-west of the regional capital Kielce.

Oksa, which in the past was spelled Oxa and Oksza, used to be a town from 1554 to 1867. It was founded by one of the most famous Polish poets, Mikolaj Rej, and the name of the town comes from Oksza – the coat of arms of the Rej family (in the Old Polish language, the word oksza meant axe). The name Oksa has been in use since app. late-19th century.

In the location of Oksa, a village of Tworow existed in the early 16th century. It belonged to a nobleman named Hieronim Rzeszowski, who in 1554 handed Tworow over to Mikolaj Rej, in exchange for the villages of Chycza and Besk. In the same year, King Zygmunt August allowed the writer to found the town of Oksza, in the location of Tworow. In order to attract settlers to his town, Mikolaj Rej provided those willing to come to Oksza with a land plot. Furthermore, residents were granted right to cut down parts of local forests, in order to create pastures. Oksa developed slowly, by 1573, the town had few artisans, ten houses and a mill. Due to efforts of Andrzej Rej, the son of Mikolaj Rej, a town hall and butcher shops were opened. At the same time however, Rej increased taxes, which did not help the development of Oksa. In the 17th century, the town belonged to several owners, who often argued with each other. Oksa was one of main centers of the Protestant Reformation in Lesser Poland, with a Calvinist prayer house, founded here by Andrzej Rej in 1570.

In 1667, after the disastrous Swedish invasion of Poland, Oksa had 26 houses and the population of 179. After the Partitions of Poland, the town briefly belonged to the Habsburg Empire, and in 1815, it became part of Russian-controlled Congress Poland. In 1827, the population of Oksa was 380, with 51 houses. During the January Uprising, a battle took place here on October 20, 1863, between Polish rebels and Russian troops. As a result, Oksa lost its town charter in 1867, and has been a village since then. In 1960, its population was 1,235.

== Oksa Parish Church ==
The parish church at Oksa was founded by Andrzej Rej in 1570 as a Calvinist prayer house (the construction of the church had been initiated by his father Mikolaj, who intended it to serve local Roman Catholics). At that time, Oksa was an important center of Reformation, here several Calvinist synods (councils) of Lesser Poland's Protestant szlachta took place in the late 16th and early 17th centuries.

In 1678, the prayer house was taken over by the Cistercians from Jędrzejów, who turned it into a Roman Catholic church, despite protests of Calvinists. In 1770, a new sacristy was built, together with a main altar. Inside the church there is a genuine, 16th century Calvinist pulpit.
