= Imielno, Świętokrzyskie Voivodeship =

Imielno
- Village
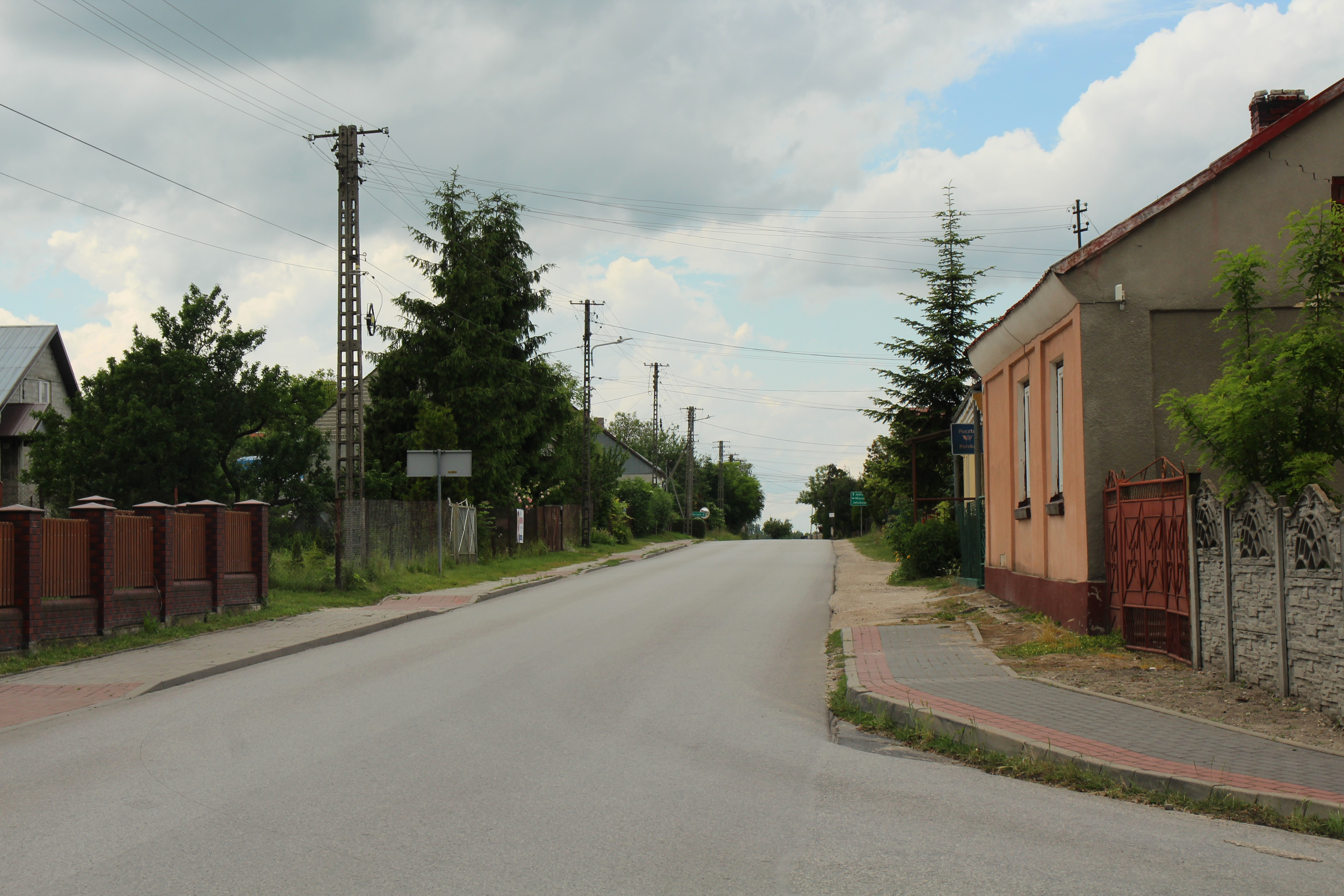

- Coat of arms

- Location within Poland
- Coordinates: 50°35′7″N 20°26′56″E
- Country: Poland
- Voivodeship: Świętokrzyskie
- County: Jędrzejów
- Gmina: Imielno
- Population: 300

Imielno [iˈmjɛlnɔ] is a village in Jędrzejów County, Świętokrzyskie Voivodeship, in south-central Poland. It is the seat of the gmina (administrative district) called Gmina Imielno. It lies approximately 12 km (7 mi) south-east of Jędrzejów and 36 km (22 mi) south of the regional capital Kielce.

Until 1954, Imielno was the seat of the Mierzwin commune. In 1975–1998, the town administratively belonged to the Kielce Voivodeship.

The village is the seat of the Imielno commune. There is a football club in the village, GKS Imielno, founded in 2016.

== History ==
According to Jan Długosz, the village was owned by the Różyc family in the 15th century.

In the 19th century, a distillery operated here, which in 1876 produced 13,842 buckets. In 1827, Imielno had 22 houses and 96 inhabitants.

== Church ==
Church of st. Nicholas from the first half of thirteenth century, brick, rebuilt in the fifteenth and seventeenth centuries, currently in the Romanesque style with Gothic and Baroque elements . The main baroque altar from the first half of the 18th century. Inside, there are epitaphs from the 16th-19th centuries. The church with the bell tower has been entered into the register of immovable monuments (registration no.: A.89/1-2 of February 11, 1967).
