= Wodzisław, Świętokrzyskie Voivodeship =

Wodzisław
- Town
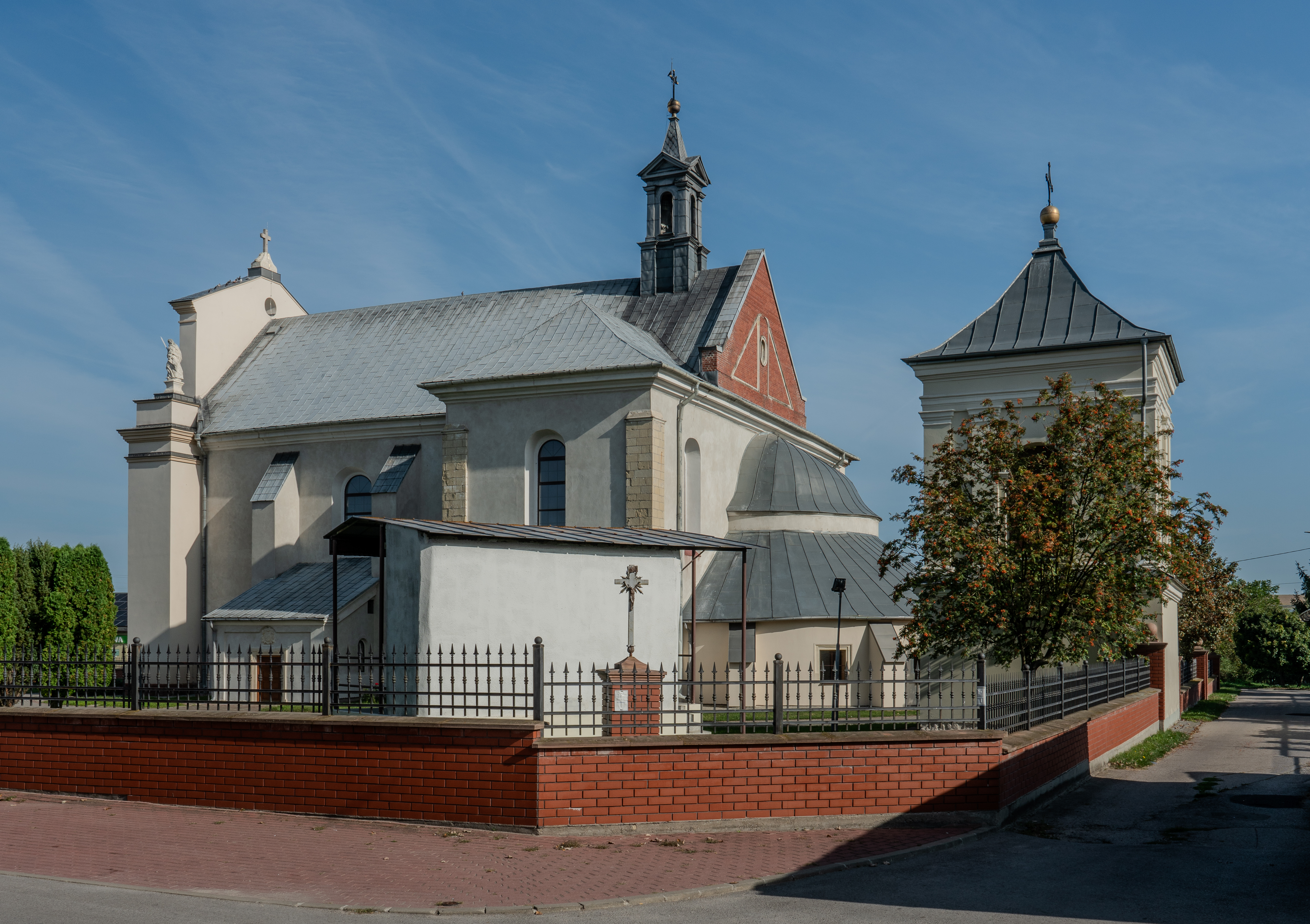
- Baroque St. Martin church

- Coat of arms

- Location within Poland
- Coordinates: 50°31′12″N 20°11′26″E
- Country: Poland
- Voivodeship: Świętokrzyskie
- County: Jędrzejów
- Gmina: Wodzisław
- Town rights: c. 1317

Population
  - Total: 1,100
- Time zone: UTC+1 (CET)
  - Summer (DST): UTC+2 (CEST)
- Vehicle registration: TJE
- Website: http://www.wodzislaw.info.pl/

Wodzisław [vɔˈd͡ʑiswaf] is a town in Jędrzejów County, Świętokrzyskie Voivodeship, in southern Poland. It is the seat of the gmina (administrative district) called Gmina Wodzisław. It lies in historic Lesser Poland, approximately 15 km (9 mi) south-west of Jędrzejów and 51 km (32 mi) south-west of the regional capital Kielce. The town has a population of 1,100.

Between the 16th and 19th centuries, Wodzisław was a property of the Lanckoroński family. It is located on the S7 highway, the main highway connecting Kraków with Kielce, Radom and Warsaw.

== History ==
Wodzisław has a long and rich history, which dates back to the reign of King Władysław I Łokietek, who granted it town rights in ca. 1317. At that time, it was called Włodzisław, and the town was a royal property. In 1370, King Casimir III the Great handed the town over to local noblemen Zbigniew and Przedbor. In the 16th century, Wodzisław became property of the Lanckoroński family, and was a local center of artisans. It was a private town, administratively located in the Sandomierz Voivodeship in the Lesser Poland Province. In 1551, the wooden Roman Catholic church was transferred to the Calvinists, and most residents switched to Calvinism. Wodzisław was one of main centers of Protestant Reformation in Lesser Poland, here as many as 20 Calvinist synods took place (1557, 1558, 1559, twice in 1560, 1561, 1566, 1583, 1589, 1590, 1595, twice in 1597, 1599, 1601, 1604, 1606, 1607, 1609, 1610, 1611, and 1612). Calvinist prayer house at Wodzisław was closed down in 1613, after the Zebrzydowski Rebellion, when town's owner Samuel Lanckoroński abandoned Calvinism and became a Roman Catholic. Soon afterwards, Lanckoroński built St. Martin church, and ordered all Calvinists either to convert, or to leave Wodzisław. The church burned in 1746, to be rebuilt in 1787 by Maciej Lanckoroński.

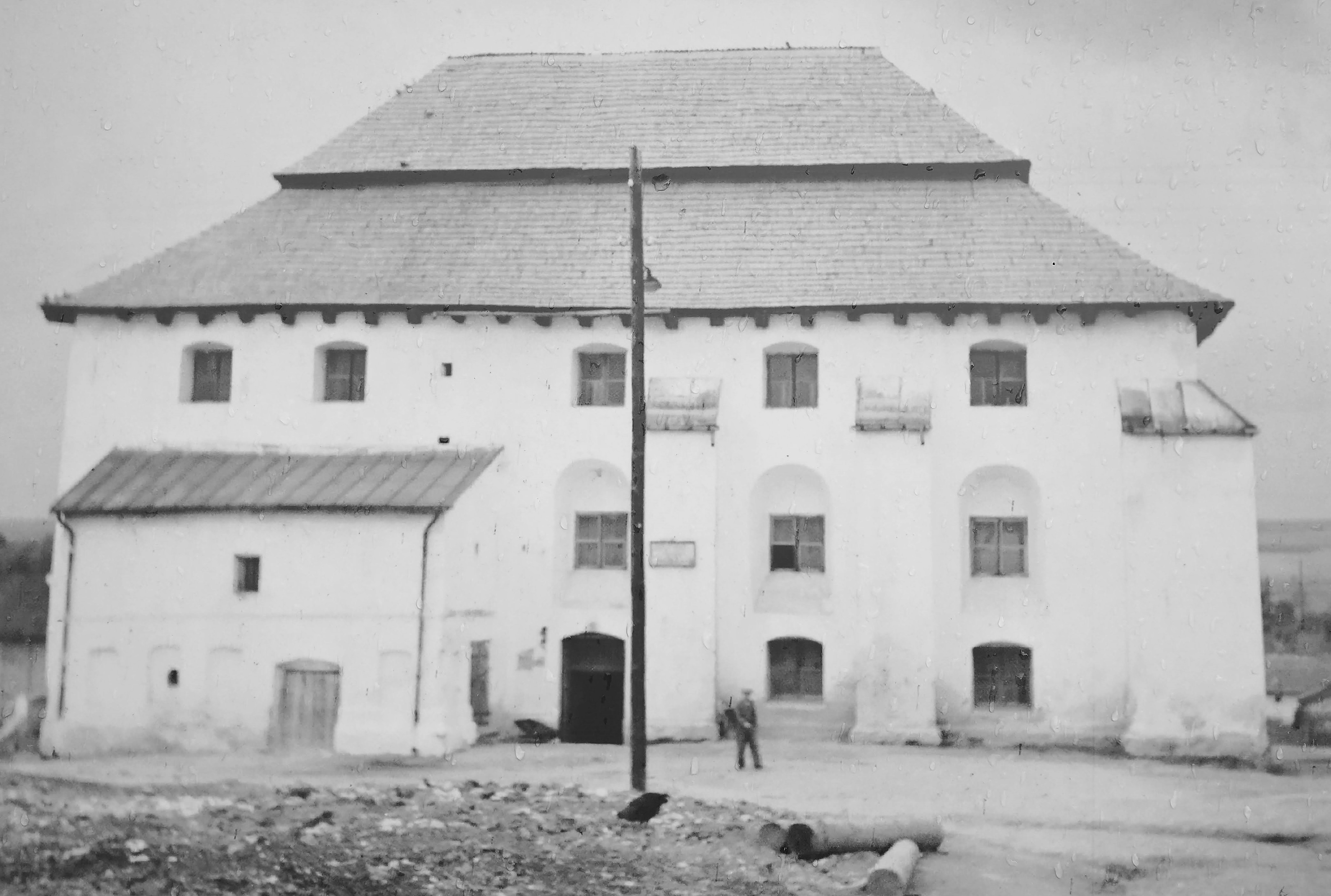
Synagogue before World War II

The town had a castle, built in mid-16th century by Jan Lanckoroński. In the late 17th century, the castle was turned into a palace, and at the same time, first Jewish settlers came to Wodzisław, and in 1720, first synagogue was opened.

In the Third Partition of Poland in 1795 it was annexed by the Habsburg Empire. After the Polish victory in the Austro-Polish War of 1809, it became part of the short-lived Duchy of Warsaw, and after the duchy's dissolution, from 1815 to 1915, it was part of Russian-controlled Congress Poland. According to the 1827 census, Wodzisław had a population of 1,760, with 191 houses. By 1857, the population grew to 2,081, with 1,463 Jews. In 1865, the town burned in a fire, and in 1869 it lost its town rights.

On 4 September 1939, during the German invasion of Poland, which started World War II, German troops committed a massacre of 30 Polish refugees from Silesia. Afterwards the town was occupied by Germany, and the occupiers committed further massacres and extrajudicial killings. A local Polish policeman was murdered by the Russians in the Katyn massacre in 1940. In mid-June 1942, the SS committed a massacre of around 50 Jews. On 20 November 1942, during the deportation of Jews to Sandomierz, a 64-year-old man was shot by the occupiers for trying to escape. In September and October 1943, the German gendarmerie and SS carried out massacres of 318 Jews. On 8 July 1944, the German police perpetrated a massacre of 13 Poles during a pacification action. There were also multiple instances of executions of one, two or three Poles at a time, including those attempting to escape arrest. The Germans had used the synagogue as a grain warehouse. In 1944, the grain was looted from the occupiers by Polish partisans from the Peasant Battalions.
