= Jędrzejów County =

Jędrzejów County Powiat jędrzejowski
- County
- Flag Coat of arms

- Location within the voivodeship

- Division into gminas
- Coordinates (Jędrzejów): 50°38′N 20°18′E
- Country: Poland
- Voivodeship: Świętokrzyskie
- Seat: Jędrzejów
- Gminas: Total 9: Gmina Imielno; Gmina Jędrzejów; Gmina Małogoszcz; Gmina Nagłowice; Gmina Oksa; Gmina Sędziszów; Gmina Słupia; Gmina Sobków; Gmina Wodzisław

Area
  - Total: 1,257.17 km^{2} (485.40 sq mi)

Population (2019)
  - Total: 84,049
  - Density: 66.856/km^{2} (173.16/sq mi)
  - Urban: 25,275
  - Rural: 58,774
- Car plates: TJE
- Website: www.jedrzejow.pl

Jędrzejów County (Polish: powiat jędrzejowski) is a unit of territorial administration and local government (powiat) in Świętokrzyskie Voivodeship, south-central Poland. It came into being on January 1, 1999, as a result of the Polish local government reforms passed in 1998. Its administrative seat and largest town is Jędrzejów, which lies 36 kilometres (22 mi) south-west of the regional capital Kielce. The county also contains the towns of Sędziszów, lying 18 km (11 mi) west of Jędrzejów, and Małogoszcz, 21 km (13 mi) north of Jędrzejów.

The county covers an area of 1,257.17 square kilometres (485.4 sq mi). As of 2019 its total population is 84,049, out of which the population of Jędrzejów is 15,076, that of Sędziszów is 6,451, that of Małogoszcz is 3,748, and the rural population is 58,774.

== Neighbouring counties ==
Jędrzejów County is bordered by Kielce County to the north-east, Pińczów County to the south-east, Miechów County to the south, Zawiercie County to the west and Włoszczowa County to the north-west.

== Administrative divisions ==
The county is subdivided into nine gminas (three urban-rural and six rural). These are listed in the following table, in descending order of population.

Gmina	Type	Area (km^{2})	Population (2019)	Seat
Gmina Jędrzejów	urban-rural	227.5	28,012	Jędrzejów
Gmina Sędziszów	urban-rural	145.7	12,510	Sędziszów
Gmina Małogoszcz	urban-rural	145.4	11,584	Małogoszcz
Gmina Sobków	rural	145.5	8,475	Sobków
Gmina Wodzisław	rural	176.7	6,975	Wodzisław
Gmina Nagłowice	rural	117.3	4,930	Nagłowice
Gmina Oksa	rural	90.3	4,579	Oksa
Gmina Imielno	rural	100.6	4,372	Imielno
Gmina Słupia	rural	107.9	2,612	Słupia
