= Zakrucze =

- Village
- Location within Poland
- Coordinates: 50°49′34″N 20°17′45″E
- Country: Poland
- Voivodeship: Świętokrzyskie
- County: Jędrzejów
- Gmina: Małogoszcz
- Population: 340

Zakrucze [zaˈkrut͡ʂɛ] is a village in the administrative district of Gmina Małogoszcz, within Jędrzejów County, Świętokrzyskie Voivodeship, in south-central Poland. It lies approximately 3 km (2 mi) north-east of Małogoszcz, 22 km (14 mi) north of Jędrzejów, and 24 km (15 mi) west of the regional capital Kielce.
