= Wola Tesserowa =

- Village
- Location within Poland
- Coordinates: 50°46′14″N 20°16′51″E
- Country: Poland
- Voivodeship: Świętokrzyskie
- County: Jędrzejów
- Gmina: Małogoszcz
- Population: 370

Wola Tesserowa [ˈvɔla tɛssɛˈrɔva] is a village in the administrative district of Gmina Małogoszcz, within Jędrzejów County, Świętokrzyskie Voivodeship, in south-central Poland. It lies approximately 5 km (3 mi) south of Małogoszcz, 16 km (10 mi) north of Jędrzejów, and 27 km (17 mi) south-west of the regional capital Kielce.
