= Złotniki, Świętokrzyskie Voivodeship =

Złotniki
- Village
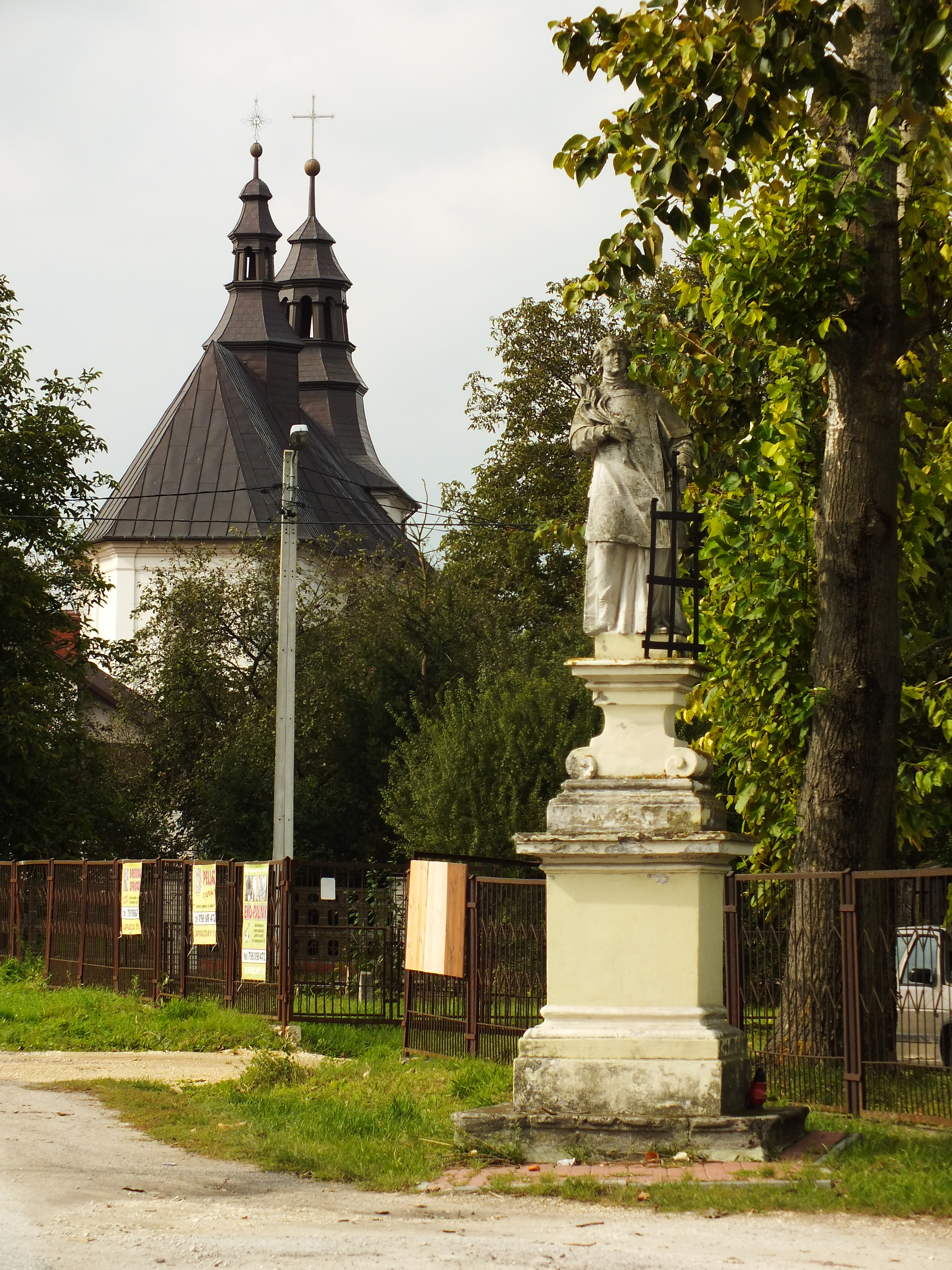

- Location within Poland
- Coordinates: 50°45′2″N 20°15′3″E
- Country: Poland
- Voivodeship: Świętokrzyskie
- County: Jędrzejów
- Gmina: Małogoszcz
- Population: 850

Złotniki [zwɔtˈniki] is a village in the administrative district of Gmina Małogoszcz, within Jędrzejów County, Świętokrzyskie Voivodeship, in south-central Poland. It lies approximately 8 km (5 mi) south of Małogoszcz, 14 km (9 mi) north of Jędrzejów, and 30 km (19 mi) south-west of the regional capital Kielce.
