= Karsznice, Świętokrzyskie Voivodeship =

Karsznice
- Village
- Location within Poland
- Coordinates: 50°46′24″N 20°18′21″E
- Country: Poland
- Voivodeship: Świętokrzyskie
- County: Jędrzejów
- Gmina: Małogoszcz

Karsznice [karʂˈnit͡sɛ] is a village in the administrative district of Gmina Małogoszcz, within Jędrzejów County, Świętokrzyskie Voivodeship, in south-central Poland. It lies approximately 6 km (4 mi) south-east of Małogoszcz, 16 km (10 mi) north of Jędrzejów, and 26 km (16 mi) south-west of the regional capital Kielce.
