= Żarczyce Małe =

- Village
- Location within Poland
- Coordinates: 50°47′2″N 20°12′12″E
- Country: Poland
- Voivodeship: Świętokrzyskie
- County: Jędrzejów
- Gmina: Małogoszcz
- Population: 440

Żarczyce Małe [ʐarˈt͡ʂɨt͡sɛ ˈmawɛ] is a village in the administrative district of Gmina Małogoszcz, within Jędrzejów County, Świętokrzyskie Voivodeship, in south-central Poland. It lies approximately 6 km (4 mi) south-west of Małogoszcz, 19 km (12 mi) north of Jędrzejów, and 32 km (20 mi) west of the regional capital Kielce.
