= Mniszek, Świętokrzyskie Voivodeship =

Mniszek
- Village
- Location within Poland
- Coordinates: 50°43′38″N 20°16′42″E
- Country: Poland
- Voivodeship: Świętokrzyskie
- County: Jędrzejów
- Gmina: Małogoszcz

Mniszek [ˈmniʂɛk] is a village in the administrative district of Gmina Małogoszcz, within Jędrzejów County, Świętokrzyskie Voivodeship, in south-central Poland. It lies approximately 10 km (6 mi) south of Małogoszcz, 11 km (7 mi) north of Jędrzejów, and 30 km (19 mi) south-west of the regional capital Kielce.
