= Leśnica, Świętokrzyskie Voivodeship =

Leśnica
- Village
- Location within Poland
- Coordinates: 50°49′27″N 20°14′44″E
- Country: Poland
- Voivodeship: Świętokrzyskie
- County: Jędrzejów
- Gmina: Małogoszcz

Leśnica [lɛɕˈnit͡sa] is a village in the administrative district of Gmina Małogoszcz, within Jędrzejów County, Świętokrzyskie Voivodeship, in south-central Poland. It lies approximately 3 km (2 mi) north-west of Małogoszcz, 22 km (14 mi) north of Jędrzejów, and 27 km (17 mi) west of the regional capital Kielce.
