= Lipnica, Świętokrzyskie Voivodeship =

Lipnica
- Village
- Location within Poland
- Coordinates: 50°44′40″N 20°16′32″E
- Country: Poland
- Voivodeship: Świętokrzyskie
- County: Jędrzejów
- Gmina: Małogoszcz
- Population: 315

Lipnica (Polish pronunciation: [lipˈɲit͡sa]) is a village in the administrative district of Gmina Małogoszcz, within Jędrzejów County, Świętokrzyskie Voivodeship, in south-central Poland. It lies approximately 8 km (5 mi) south of Małogoszcz, 13 km (8 mi) north of Jędrzejów, and 29 km (18 mi) south-west of the regional capital Kielce.
