= Sandomierz Town Hall =

Coordinates: 50.6794°N 21.7494°E

Ratusz w Sandomierzu (Sandomierz Town Hall)
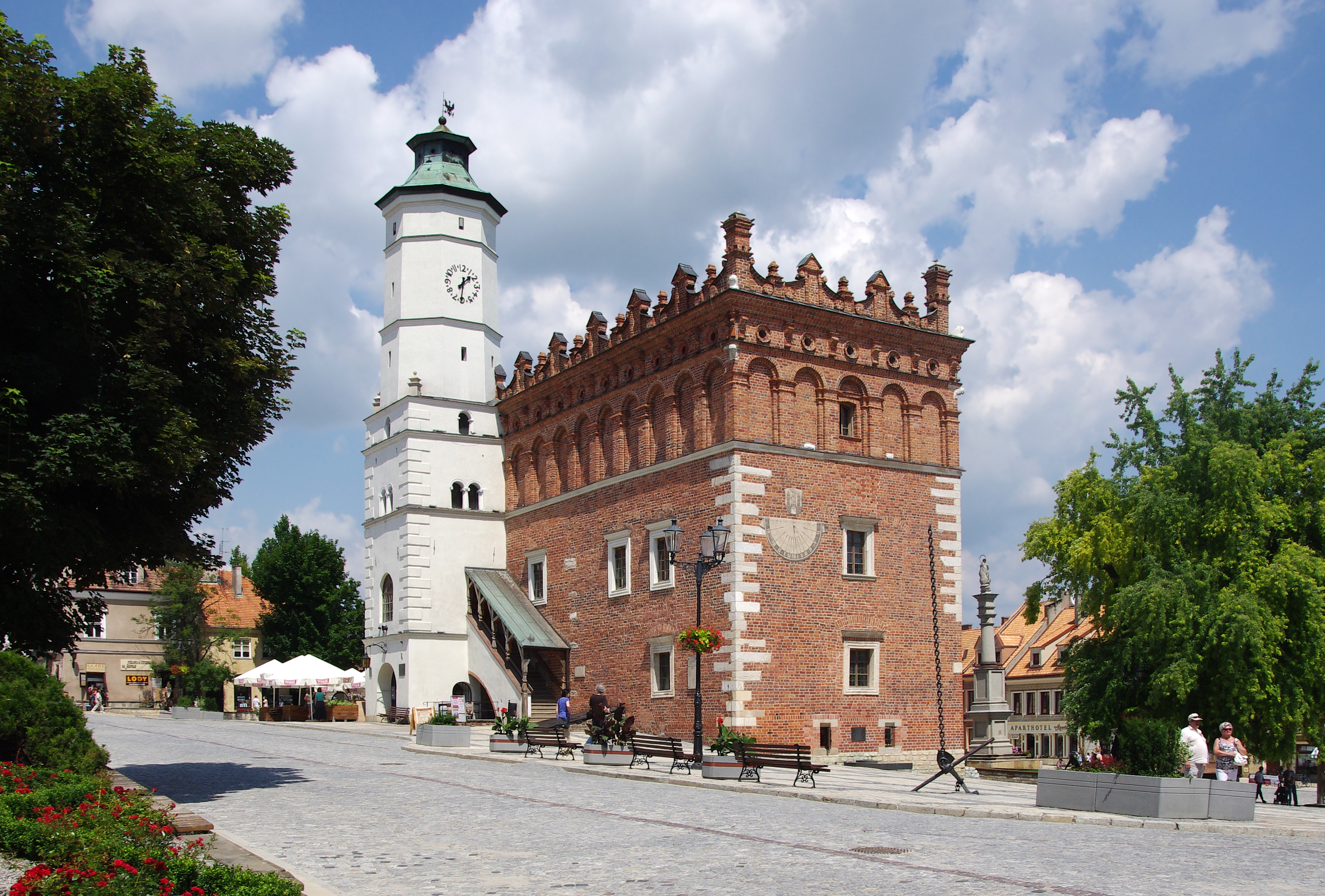
- Sandomierz Town Hall
- Interactive map of the Ratusz w Sandomierzu (Sandomierz Town Hall) area

General information
- Type: Town hall
- Architectural style: Gothic, Renaissance
- Location: Sandomierz, Poland
- Completed: 1349

Sandomierz Town Hall – a building raised shortly after the Lithuanian Invasion in 1349. Formerly Gothic, the town hall had an octagonal tower. The southern side (with the sundial), being the oldest was built at the turning point of the fourteenth and fifteenth-century. In the sixteenth century, the building was expanded, in the form of an extended rectangular structure, which was then top outed with an attic tripartite, constructed by Italian sculptor Jan Maria Padovano. The corners of the attic are decorated with heads represented the four estates of the realm. The tower was built in the seventeenth century.

The southern side of the town hall has a sundial made using the sgraffito technique, by Tadeusz Przypkowski (1958), who was the former owner of the Przypkowscy Clock Museum in Jędrzejów. From the east-side of the town house there is a Statue of Mary's Immaculate Conception from 1776.

At the 12:00 hour the Hejnał is played from the town hall's tower.
