= Lasochów =

- Village
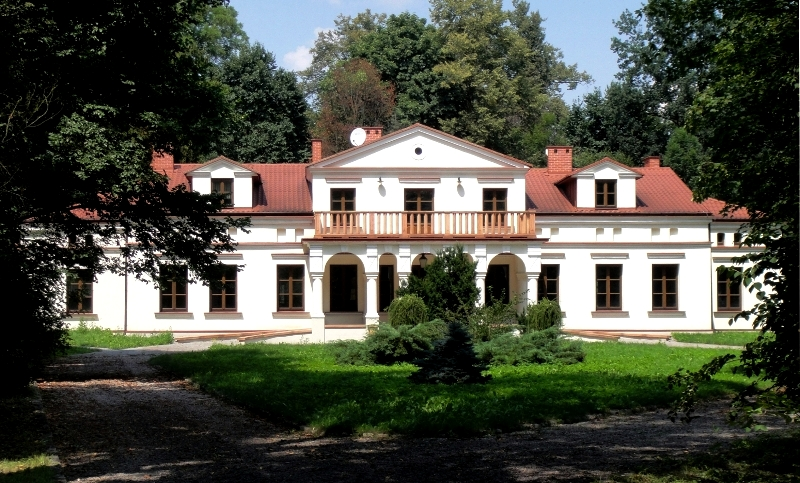
- Manor house

- Location within Poland
- Coordinates: 50°47′25″N 20°10′22″E
- Country: Poland
- Voivodeship: Świętokrzyskie
- County: Jędrzejów
- Gmina: Małogoszcz
- Population: 210

Lasochów [laˈsɔxuf] is a village in the administrative district of Gmina Małogoszcz, within Jędrzejów County, Świętokrzyskie Voivodeship, in south-central Poland. It lies approximately 8 km (5 mi) west of Małogoszcz, 20 km (12 mi) north-west of Jędrzejów, and 33 km (21 mi) west of the regional capital Kielce.
