= Ludwinów, Gmina Małogoszcz =

Ludwinów
- Village
- Location within Poland
- Coordinates: 50°49′20″N 20°11′13″E
- Country: Poland
- Voivodeship: Świętokrzyskie
- County: Jędrzejów
- Gmina: Małogoszcz
- Population: 350

Ludwinów [ludˈvinuf] is a village in the administrative district of Gmina Małogoszcz, within Jędrzejów County, Świętokrzyskie Voivodeship, in south-central Poland. It lies approximately 6 km (4 mi) west of Małogoszcz, 23 km (14 mi) north of Jędrzejów, and 31 km (19 mi) west of the regional capital Kielce.
