= Henryków, Świętokrzyskie Voivodeship =

Henryków
- Village
- Location within Poland
- Coordinates: 50°48′52″N 20°8′13″E
- Country: Poland
- Voivodeship: Świętokrzyskie
- County: Jędrzejów
- Gmina: Małogoszcz

Henryków [xɛnˈrɨkuf] is a village in the administrative district of Gmina Małogoszcz, within Jędrzejów County, Świętokrzyskie Voivodeship, in south-central Poland. It lies approximately 10 km (6 mi) west of Małogoszcz, 24 km (15 mi) north-west of Jędrzejów, and 35 km (22 mi) west of the regional capital Kielce.
