= Leon Kozłowski =

Polish politician and archeologist (1892–1944)

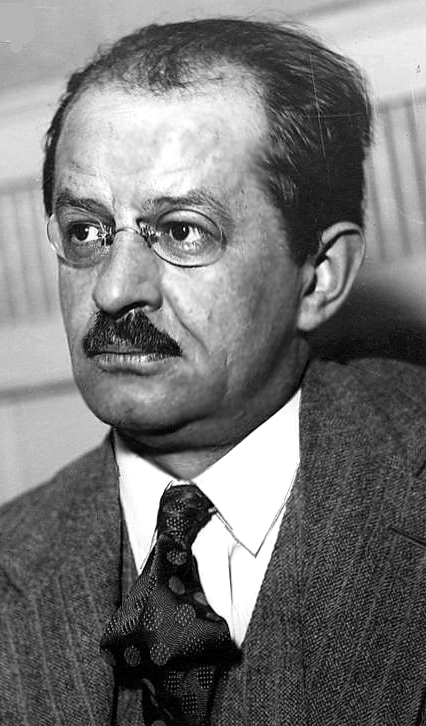
- Leon Kozłowski

Prime Minister of Poland
- In office 15 May 1934 – 28 March 1935
- President: Ignacy Mościcki
- Preceded by: Janusz Jędrzejewicz
- Succeeded by: Walery Sławek

Personal details
- Born: Leon Tadeusz Kozłowski; 6 June 1892 Rembieszyce, Congress Poland
- Died: 11 May 1944 (aged 51) Berlin, German Reich
- Resting place: Powązki Cemetery
- Party: Non-partisan Bloc for Cooperation with the Government
- Profession: Archaeologist

Leon Tadeusz Kozłowski (Polish pronunciation: [ˈlɛɔn kɔˈzwɔfskʲi]; 6 June 1892 – 11 May 1944) was a Polish archaeologist, freemason, and politician who served as Prime Minister of Poland from 1934 to 1935.

== Life ==
Leon Kozłowski was born in 1892 in the village of Rembieszyce near Małogoszcz. Prior to 1914 he moved with his family to Lwów in Galicia (now Lviv, Ukraine), where he joined the local university. He also joined the Riflemen Union and Association of Progressive Youth. After the outbreak of the Great War he joined Józef Piłsudski's Polish Legions, where he served in the 1st Uhlans Regiment. After the Oath Crisis of 1917 he joined the Polish Military Organization and organized the cadres of the future Polish Army.

When Poland regained her independence in 1918, Kozłowski volunteered for the Polish Army and served with distinction during the Polish-Soviet War. Afterwards he was demobilized and returned to Lwów, where he completed his studies at the University of Jan Kazimierz. In 1921 he became a professor there and the head of the Faculty of Pre-history. He held that post between 1921 and 1931 and then again between 1935 and 1939. He was also active in various social and political organizations, including the Society for the Repair of the Republic. As such, following a military coup in 1928 he got involved in the BBWR movement and the same year he was elected to the Sejm. He held the post of a Member of Parliament until 1935, when he was chosen to the Senate of Poland.

During his political career he held various posts in several governments led by the Sanacja movement. He was responsible for the establishment of the prison camp at Bereza Kartuska. Between 1930 and 1935 he was the minister of agrarian reforms. At the same time, between 1932 and 1933 he was a sub-secretary of state in the Ministry of Treasury. Finally, on 15 May 1934, Kozłowski became the Prime Minister of Poland. He held that post until 28 March 1935, when he was replaced by Walery Sławek. On the insistence of Piłsudski, all of the ministers of Kozłowski's government were included in the new government. After death of Marshal of Poland Józef Piłsudski, Kozłowski remained an active politician for some time. He was seen as a representative of the leftist part of the Sanacja movement and a supporter of Walery Sławek. However, the latter lost the race to Piłsudski's heritage and Kozłowski returned to Lwów, where he reassumed his posts at the university. In 1937 he also briefly got involved in the Obóz Zjednoczenia Narodowego movement, but without much success.

After the Polish Defensive War of 1939 and the outbreak of the World War II, Leon Kozłowski remained in Lwów, where he was arrested by the NKVD. He spent almost two years in various Soviet prisons, and finally was sentenced to death for "anti-Soviet behaviour". However, after the Sikorski–Mayski agreement of 1941 he was released and travelled to Buzuluk, where he tried joined up with the Polish Army formed there by general Władysław Anders. Due to his political past, he was refused. He then left the military camp and started his 1000-mile long trip westwards, accompanied by one officer, intending to join the Germans. He crossed the Soviet-German frontline, for which he was sentenced to death in absentia by a Polish court.

German authorities sent him on to Berlin. Whilst there he took part in talks with the Nazi authorities, which saw him as a possible collaborationist, and an ally in winning the Poles over to the German cause. It is certain however, that in May 1943 he was sent to the site of the Katyn Massacre as one of the experts brought to the site by the German authorities. Though he had expressed doubts of the version of the events as presented by the Reich Ministry for Propaganda under Joseph Goebbels, he became convinced of the Soviet guilt after having seen the mass graves and conversed with the members of the expert commission of the Polish Red Cross under forensic doctor Marian Wodziński The pro-German Polish language daily Goniec Krakowski cited Kozłowski as saying that he had recognized acquaintances among the dead bodies, among them professors from Lwów and ministerial officials from Warsaw.

Interned in Berlin (at the Hotel Alemannia), Leon Kozłowski found work at an ethnographic museum and could pursue scientific research. He was also awarded a considerable monthly pension. He was wounded in an Allied air raid on the German capital and died of his wounds on 11 May 1944.

== See also ==
- List of Poles

Government offices
Preceded by Janusz Jędrzejewicz	Prime Minister of Poland; 1934–1935	Succeeded by Walery Sławek
