= Mieronice, Gmina Małogoszcz =

Mieronice
- Village
- Location within Poland
- Coordinates: 50°47′18″N 20°16′1″E
- Country: Poland
- Voivodeship: Świętokrzyskie
- County: Jędrzejów
- Gmina: Małogoszcz

Mieronice [mjɛrɔˈnit͡sɛ] is a village in the administrative district of Gmina Małogoszcz, within Jędrzejów County, Świętokrzyskie Voivodeship, in south-central Poland. It lies approximately 3 km (2 mi) south of Małogoszcz, 18 km (11 mi) north of Jędrzejów, and 27 km (17 mi) south-west of the regional capital Kielce. The village has a population of 620.
