= Bocheniec =

Bocheniec refers to the following places in Poland:

- Bocheniec, Kuyavian-Pomeranian Voivodeship
- Bocheniec, Świętokrzyskie Voivodeship
