= Lścin =

- Village
- Location within Poland
- Coordinates: 50°37′55″N 20°24′26″E
- Country: Poland
- Voivodeship: Świętokrzyskie
- County: Jędrzejów
- Gmina: Jędrzejów

Lścin [lɕt͡ɕin] is a village in the administrative district of Gmina Jędrzejów, within Jędrzejów County, Świętokrzyskie Voivodeship, in south-central Poland. It lies approximately 8 km (5 mi) east of Jędrzejów and 32 km (20 mi) south-west of the regional capital Kielce.
