= Wygoda, Gmina Jędrzejów =

Wygoda
- Village
- Location within Poland
- Coordinates: 50°41′14″N 20°23′4″E
- Country: Poland
- Voivodeship: Świętokrzyskie
- County: Jędrzejów
- Gmina: Jędrzejów

Wygoda [vɨˈɡɔda] is a village in the administrative district of Gmina Jędrzejów, within Jędrzejów County, Świętokrzyskie Voivodeship, in south-central Poland. It lies approximately 9 km (6 mi) north-east of Jędrzejów and 28 km (17 mi) south-west of the regional capital Kielce.
