= Prząsław Mały =

- Village
- Location within Poland
- Coordinates: 50°38′10″N 20°13′42″E
- Country: Poland
- Voivodeship: Świętokrzyskie
- County: Jędrzejów
- Gmina: Jędrzejów
- Population: 120

Prząsław Mały [ˈpʂɔ̃swaf ˈmawɨ] is a village in the administrative district of Gmina Jędrzejów, within Jędrzejów County, Świętokrzyskie Voivodeship, in south-central Poland. It lies approximately 6 km (4 mi) west of Jędrzejów and 39 km (24 mi) south-west of the regional capital Kielce.
