= Borów =

Borów may refer to the following places in Poland:

- Gmina Borów in Lower Silesian Voivodeship
- Borów, Polkowice County in Lower Silesian Voivodeship (south-west Poland)
- Borów, Strzelin County in Lower Silesian Voivodeship (south-west Poland)
- Borów, Świdnica County in Lower Silesian Voivodeship (south-west Poland)
- Borów, Trzebnica County in Lower Silesian Voivodeship (south-west Poland)
- Borów, Gmina Grabów in Łódź Voivodeship (central Poland)
- Borów, Gmina Łęczyca in Łódź Voivodeship (central Poland)
- Borów, Łowicz County in Łódź Voivodeship (central Poland)
- Borów, Krasnystaw County in Lublin Voivodeship (east Poland)
- Borów, Kraśnik County in Lublin Voivodeship (east Poland)
- Borów, Gmina Chodel in Opole County, Lublin Voivodeship (east Poland)
- Borów, Świętokrzyskie Voivodeship (south-central Poland)
- Borów, Masovian Voivodeship (east-central Poland)
- Borów, Greater Poland Voivodeship (west-central Poland)
- Borów, Lubusz Voivodeship (west Poland)
