= Książe-Skroniów =

- Village
- Location within Poland
- Coordinates: 50°38′31″N 20°15′18″E
- Country: Poland
- Voivodeship: Świętokrzyskie
- County: Jędrzejów
- Gmina: Jędrzejów

Książe-Skroniów [ˈkɕɔ̃ʐɛ ˈskrɔɲuf] is a village in the administrative district of Gmina Jędrzejów, within Jędrzejów County, Świętokrzyskie Voivodeship, in south-central Poland. It lies approximately 4 km (2 mi) west of Jędrzejów and 37 km (23 mi) south-west of the regional capital Kielce.
