= Wrzosówka, Świętokrzyskie Voivodeship =

Wrzosówka
- Village
- Location within Poland
- Coordinates: 50°51′11″N 20°16′41″E
- Country: Poland
- Voivodeship: Świętokrzyskie
- County: Jędrzejów
- Gmina: Małogoszcz

Wrzosówka [vʐɔˈsufka] is a village in the administrative district of Gmina Małogoszcz, within Jędrzejów County, Świętokrzyskie Voivodeship, in south-central Poland. It lies approximately 5 km (3 mi) north of Małogoszcz, 25 km (16 mi) north of Jędrzejów, and 25 km (16 mi) west of the regional capital Kielce.
