= Gozna =

- Village
- Location within Poland
- Coordinates: 50°39′39″N 20°24′18″E
- Country: Poland
- Voivodeship: Świętokrzyskie
- County: Jędrzejów
- Gmina: Jędrzejów

Gozna [ˈɡɔzna] is a village in the administrative district of Gmina Jędrzejów, within Jędrzejów County, Świętokrzyskie Voivodeship, in south-central Poland. It lies approximately 9 km (6 mi) east of Jędrzejów and 29 km (18 mi) south-west of the regional capital Kielce.
