= Cierno-Zaszosie =

- Village
- Location within Poland
- Coordinates: 50°39′24″N 20°12′11″E
- Country: Poland
- Voivodeship: Świętokrzyskie
- County: Jędrzejów
- Gmina: Jędrzejów

Cierno-Zaszosie [ˈt͡ɕɛrnɔ zaˈʂɔɕɛ] is a village in the administrative district of Gmina Jędrzejów, within Jędrzejów County, Świętokrzyskie Voivodeship, in south-central Poland. It lies approximately 8 km (5 mi) west of Jędrzejów and 39 km (24 mi) south-west of the regional capital Kielce.
