= Gmina Małogoszcz =

Gmina Małogoszcz Małogoszcz Commune
- Gmina
- Flag Coat of arms
- Interactive map of Gmina Małogoszcz
- Coordinates (Małogoszcz): 50°48′48″N 20°16′6″E
- Country: Poland
- Voivodeship: Świętokrzyskie
- County: Jędrzejów
- Seat: Małogoszcz

Area
  - Total: 145.37 km^{2} (56.13 sq mi)

Population (2006)
  - Total: 11,728
  - Density: 80.677/km^{2} (208.95/sq mi)
  - Urban: 4,022
  - Rural: 7,815
- Website: https://www.malogoszcz.pl

Gmina Małogoszcz is an urban-rural gmina (administrative district) in Jędrzejów County, Świętokrzyskie Voivodeship, in south-central Poland. Its seat is the town of Małogoszcz, which lies approximately 21 kilometres (13 mi) north of Jędrzejów and 26 km (16 mi) west of the regional capital Kielce.

The gmina covers an area of 145.37 square kilometres (56.1 sq mi), and as of 2006 its total population is 11,758 (out of which the population of Małogoszcz amounts to 3,943, and the population of the rural part of the gmina is 7,815).

The gmina contains part of the protected area called Chęciny-Kielce Landscape Park.

== Villages ==
Apart from the town of Małogoszcz, Gmina Małogoszcz contains the villages and settlements of Bocheniec, Henryków, Karsznice, Kozłów, Lasochów, Leśnica, Lipnica, Ludwinów, Mieronice, Mniszek, Rembieszyce, Wiśnicz, Wola Tesserowa, Wrzosówka, Wygnanów, Zakrucze, Żarczyce Duże, Żarczyce Małe and Złotniki.

== Neighbouring gminas ==
Gmina Małogoszcz is bordered by the gminas of Chęciny, Jędrzejów, Krasocin, Łopuszno, Oksa, Piekoszów, Sobków and Włoszczowa.
