= Żarczyce Duże =

- Village
- Location within Poland
- Coordinates: 50°47′37″N 20°13′22″E
- Country: Poland
- Voivodeship: Świętokrzyskie
- County: Jędrzejów
- Gmina: Małogoszcz
- Population: 540

Żarczyce Duże [ʐarˈt͡ʂɨt͡sɛ ˈduʐɛ] is a village in the administrative district of Gmina Małogoszcz, within Jędrzejów County, Świętokrzyskie Voivodeship, in south-central Poland. It lies approximately 4 km (2 mi) south-west of Małogoszcz, 19 km (12 mi) north of Jędrzejów, and 30 km (19 mi) west of the regional capital Kielce.
