= Zagaje =

Zagaje may refer to the following places:

- Zagaje, Kraków County in Lesser Poland Voivodeship (south Poland)
- Zagaje, Proszowice County in Lesser Poland Voivodeship (south Poland)
- Zagaje, Świętokrzyskie Voivodeship (south-central Poland)
- Zagaje (Pawłowice), Gmina Sędziszów, Jędrzejów County, Świętokrzyskie Voivodeship (south-central Poland)
- Zagaje, Strzelce-Drezdenko County in Lubusz Voivodeship (west Poland)
- Zagaje, Świebodzin County in Lubusz Voivodeship (west Poland)
- Zagaje, Pomeranian Voivodeship (north Poland)
- Zagaje, Kwidzyn County in Pomeranian Voivodeship (north Poland)
- Zagaje, Warmian-Masurian Voivodeship (north Poland)
- Zagaje, West Pomeranian Voivodeship (north-west Poland)
