= Borki, Jędrzejów County =

Borki
- Village
- Location within Poland
- Coordinates: 50°37′28″N 20°20′50″E
- Country: Poland
- Voivodeship: Świętokrzyskie
- County: Jędrzejów
- Gmina: Jędrzejów

Borki [ˈbɔrki] is a village in the administrative district of Gmina Jędrzejów, within Jędrzejów County, Świętokrzyskie Voivodeship, in south-central Poland. It lies approximately 4 km (2 mi) east of Jędrzejów and 35 km (22 mi) south-west of the regional capital Kielce.
