= Lasków, Świętokrzyskie Voivodeship =

Lasków
- Village
- Location within Poland
- Coordinates: 50°40′50″N 20°17′59″E
- Country: Poland
- Voivodeship: Świętokrzyskie
- County: Jędrzejów
- Gmina: Jędrzejów

Lasków [ˈlaskuf] is a village in the administrative district of Gmina Jędrzejów, within Jędrzejów County, Świętokrzyskie Voivodeship, in south-central Poland. It lies approximately 6 km (4 mi) north of Jędrzejów and 32 km (20 mi) south-west of the regional capital Kielce.
