= Mnichów, Świętokrzyskie Voivodeship =

Mnichów
- Village
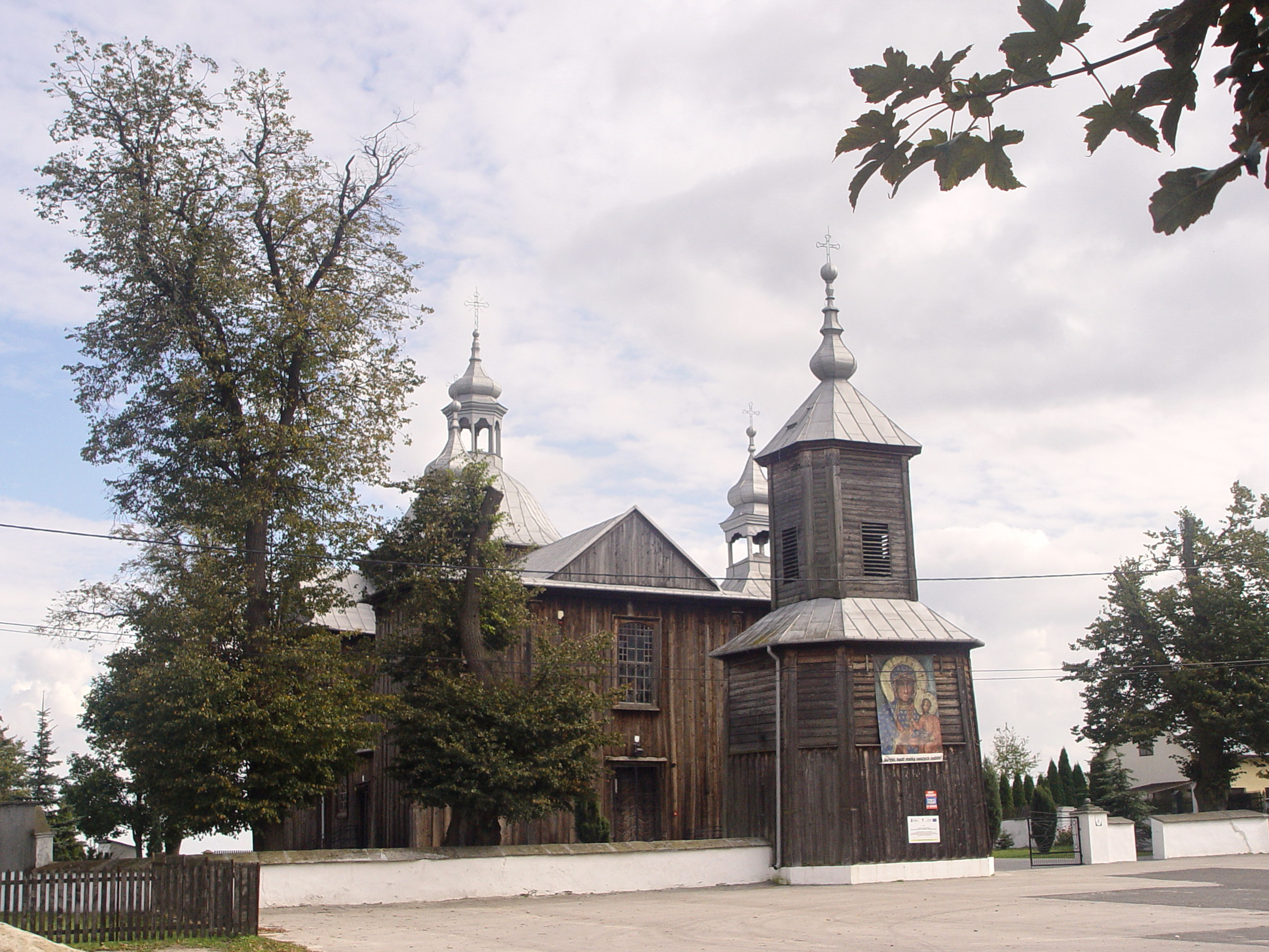
- Church of Saint Stephen

- Location within Poland
- Coordinates: 50°41′59″N 20°22′2″E
- Country: Poland
- Voivodeship: Świętokrzyskie
- County: Jędrzejów
- Gmina: Jędrzejów

Population
  - Total: 1,100

Mnichów [ˈmnixuf] is a village in the administrative district of Gmina Jędrzejów, within Jędrzejów County, Świętokrzyskie Voivodeship, in south-central Poland. It lies approximately 9 km (6 mi) north-east of Jędrzejów and 27 km (17 mi) south-west of the regional capital Kielce.
