= Wygnanów =

Wygnanów may refer to the following places:

- Wygnanów, Gmina Opoczno in Łódź Voivodeship (central Poland)
- Wygnanów, Gmina Sławno in Łódź Voivodeship (central Poland)
- Wygnanów, Lublin Voivodeship (east Poland)
- Wygnanów, Lesser Poland Voivodeship (south Poland)
- Wygnanów, Świętokrzyskie Voivodeship (south-central Poland)
- Wygnanów, Masovian Voivodeship (east-central Poland)
