= Prząsław =

- Village
- Location within Poland
- Coordinates: 50°39′21″N 20°13′15″E
- Country: Poland
- Voivodeship: Świętokrzyskie
- County: Jędrzejów
- Gmina: Jędrzejów
- Population: 410

Prząsław [ˈpʂɔ̃swaf] is a village in the administrative district of Gmina Jędrzejów, within Jędrzejów County, Świętokrzyskie Voivodeship, in south-central Poland. It lies approximately 7 km (4 mi) north-west of Jędrzejów and 38 km (24 mi) south-west of the regional capital Kielce.
