= Przysów =

- Village
- Location within Poland
- Coordinates: 50°40′14″N 20°13′25″E
- Country: Poland
- Voivodeship: Świętokrzyskie
- County: Jędrzejów
- Gmina: Jędrzejów

Przysów [ˈpʂɨsuf] is a village in the administrative district of Gmina Jędrzejów, within Jędrzejów County, Świętokrzyskie Voivodeship, in south-central Poland. It lies approximately 7 km (4 mi) north-west of Jędrzejów and 37 km (23 mi) south-west of the regional capital Kielce.
