= Podchojny =

- Village
- Location within Poland
- Coordinates: 50°39′29″N 20°20′10″E
- Country: Poland
- Voivodeship: Świętokrzyskie
- County: Jędrzejów
- Gmina: Jędrzejów
- Population: 780

Podchojny [pɔtˈxɔi̯nɨ] is a village in the administrative district of Gmina Jędrzejów, within Jędrzejów County, Świętokrzyskie Voivodeship, in south-central Poland. It lies approximately 4 km (2 mi) north-east of Jędrzejów and 32 km (20 mi) south-west of the regional capital Kielce.
