= Potok Mały =

- Village
- Location within Poland
- Coordinates: 50°35′37″N 20°13′50″E
- Country: Poland
- Voivodeship: Świętokrzyskie
- County: Jędrzejów
- Gmina: Jędrzejów
- Population: 240

Potok Mały [ˈpɔtɔk ˈmawɨ] is a village in the administrative district of Gmina Jędrzejów, within Jędrzejów County, Świętokrzyskie Voivodeship, in south-central Poland. It lies approximately 7 km (4 mi) south-west of Jędrzejów and 43 km (27 mi) south-west of the regional capital Kielce.
