= Węgleniec =

- Village
- Location within Poland
- Coordinates: 50°36′28″N 20°21′4″E
- Country: Poland
- Voivodeship: Świętokrzyskie
- County: Jędrzejów
- Gmina: Jędrzejów
- Population: 180

Węgleniec [vɛŋˈɡlɛɲɛt͡s] is a village in the administrative district of Gmina Jędrzejów, within Jędrzejów County, Świętokrzyskie Voivodeship, in south-central Poland. It lies approximately 5 km (3 mi) south-east of Jędrzejów and 36 km (22 mi) south-west of the regional capital Kielce.
