= Ludwinów, Gmina Jędrzejów =

Ludwinów
- Village
- Location within Poland
- Coordinates: 50°36′38″N 20°18′5″E
- Country: Poland
- Voivodeship: Świętokrzyskie
- County: Jędrzejów
- Gmina: Jędrzejów

Ludwinów [ludˈvinuf] is a village in the administrative district of Gmina Jędrzejów, within Jędrzejów County, Świętokrzyskie Voivodeship, in south-central Poland. It lies approximately 3 km (2 mi) south of Jędrzejów and 38 km (24 mi) south-west of the regional capital Kielce.
