= Podlaszcze =

- Village
- Location within Poland
- Coordinates: 50°39′39″N 20°22′22″E
- Country: Poland
- Voivodeship: Świętokrzyskie
- County: Jędrzejów
- Gmina: Jędrzejów
- Population: 120

Podlaszcze [pɔdˈlaʂt͡ʂɛ] is a village in the administrative district of Gmina Jędrzejów, within Jędrzejów County, Świętokrzyskie Voivodeship, in south-central Poland. It lies approximately 6 km (4 mi) north-east of Jędrzejów and 31 km (19 mi) south-west of the regional capital Kielce.
