= Brus, Świętokrzyskie Voivodeship =

Brus
- Village
- Location within Poland
- Coordinates: 50°40′32″N 20°24′5″E
- Country: Poland
- Voivodeship: Świętokrzyskie
- County: Jędrzejów
- Gmina: Jędrzejów

Brus [brus] is a village in the administrative district of Gmina Jędrzejów, within Jędrzejów County, Świętokrzyskie Voivodeship, in south-central Poland. It lies approximately 9 km (6 mi) north-east of Jędrzejów and 28 km (17 mi) south-west of the regional capital Kielce.
