= Potok Wielki, Świętokrzyskie Voivodeship =

Potok Wielki
- Village
- Location within Poland
- Coordinates: 50°36′N 20°13′E
- Country: Poland
- Voivodeship: Świętokrzyskie
- County: Jędrzejów
- Gmina: Jędrzejów

Potok Wielki (Polish pronunciation: [ˈpɔtɔk ˈfjɛlkʲi]) is a village in the administrative district of Gmina Jędrzejów, within Jędrzejów County, Świętokrzyskie Voivodeship, in south-central Poland. It lies approximately 7 km (4 mi) south-west of Jędrzejów and 43 km (27 mi) south-west of the regional capital Kielce.
