= Raków, Jędrzejów County =

Raków
- Village
- Location within Poland
- Coordinates: 50°38′26″N 20°22′39″E
- Country: Poland
- Voivodeship: Świętokrzyskie
- County: Jędrzejów
- Gmina: Jędrzejów

Raków [ˈrakuf] is a village in the administrative district of Gmina Jędrzejów, within Jędrzejów County, Świętokrzyskie Voivodeship, in south-central Poland. It lies approximately 6 km (4 mi) east of Jędrzejów and 32 km (20 mi) south-west of the regional capital Kielce.
