= Wygnanów, Świętokrzyskie Voivodeship =

Wygnanów
- Village
- Location within Poland
- Coordinates: 50°46′25″N 20°13′53″E
- Country: Poland
- Voivodeship: Świętokrzyskie
- County: Jędrzejów
- Gmina: Małogoszcz

Wygnanów [vɨɡˈnanuf] is a village in the administrative district of Gmina Małogoszcz, within Jędrzejów County, Świętokrzyskie Voivodeship, in south-central Poland. It lies approximately 6 km (4 mi) south-west of Małogoszcz, 17 km (11 mi) north of Jędrzejów, and 30 km (19 mi) south-west of the regional capital Kielce.
