= Diament, Świętokrzyskie Voivodeship =

Diament
- Village
- Location within Poland
- Coordinates: 50°36′40″N 20°15′20″E
- Country: Poland
- Voivodeship: Świętokrzyskie
- County: Jędrzejów
- Gmina: Jędrzejów

Diament [ˈdjamɛnt] is a village in the administrative district of Gmina Jędrzejów, within Jędrzejów County, Świętokrzyskie Voivodeship, in south-central Poland. It lies approximately 4 km (2 mi) south-west of Jędrzejów and 40 km (25 mi) south-west of the regional capital Kielce.
