= Wólka, Jędrzejów County =

Wólka
- Village
- Location within Poland
- Coordinates: 50°38′23″N 20°25′59″E
- Country: Poland
- Voivodeship: Świętokrzyskie
- County: Jędrzejów
- Gmina: Jędrzejów

Wólka [ˈvulka] is a village in the administrative district of Gmina Jędrzejów, within Jędrzejów County, Świętokrzyskie Voivodeship, in south-central Poland. It lies approximately 10 km (6 mi) east of Jędrzejów and 30 km (19 mi) south-west of the regional capital Kielce.
