= Łysaków pod Lasem =

- Village
- Location within Poland
- Coordinates: 50°35′39″N 20°18′4″E
- Country: Poland
- Voivodeship: Świętokrzyskie
- County: Jędrzejów
- Gmina: Jędrzejów

Łysaków pod Lasem [wɨˈsakuf ˈpɔt ˈlasɛm] is a village in the administrative district of Gmina Jędrzejów, within Jędrzejów County, Świętokrzyskie Voivodeship, in south-central Poland. It lies approximately 5 km (3 mi) south of Jędrzejów and 40 km (25 mi) south-west of the regional capital Kielce.
