= Chwaścice =

- Village
- Location within Poland
- Coordinates: 50°38′38″N 20°25′50″E
- Country: Poland
- Voivodeship: Świętokrzyskie
- County: Jędrzejów
- Gmina: Jędrzejów
- Population: 160

Chwaścice [xfaɕˈt͡ɕit͡sɛ] is a village in the administrative district of Gmina Jędrzejów, within Jędrzejów County, Świętokrzyskie Voivodeship, in south-central Poland. It lies approximately 10 km (6 mi) east of Jędrzejów and 30 km (19 mi) south-west of the regional capital Kielce.
