= Wrzosówka =

Wrzosówka may refer to the following places:

- Wrzosówka, Lublin Voivodeship (east Poland)
- Wrzosówka, Masovian Voivodeship (east-central Poland)
- Wrzosówka, Świętokrzyskie Voivodeship (south-central Poland)
