= Skroniów =

- Village
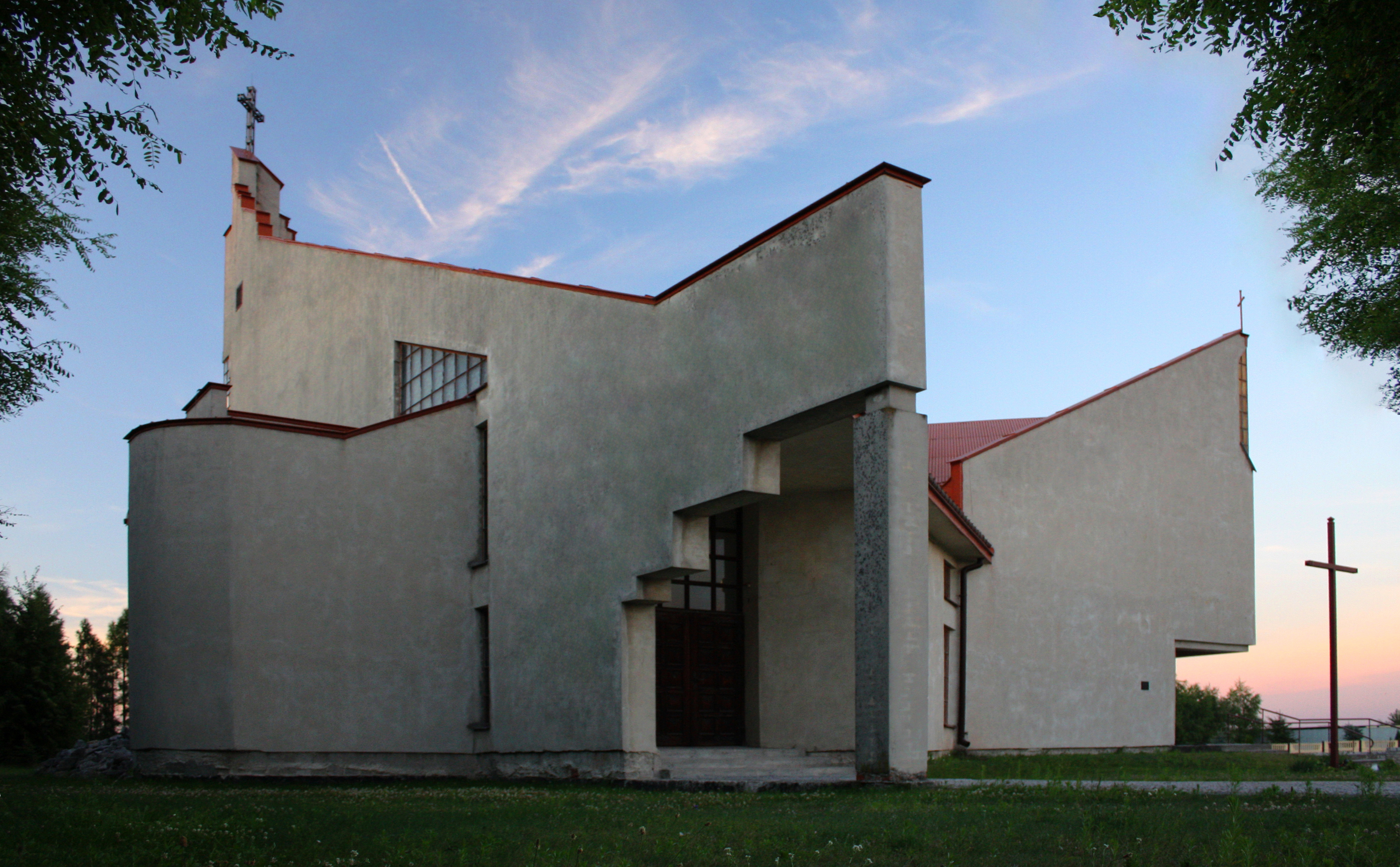
- Catholic church

- Location within Poland
- Coordinates: 50°37′41″N 20°15′41″E
- Country: Poland
- Voivodeship: Świętokrzyskie
- County: Jędrzejów
- Gmina: Jędrzejów
- Population: 870

Skroniów [ˈskrɔɲuf] is a village in the administrative district of Gmina Jędrzejów, within Jędrzejów County, Świętokrzyskie Voivodeship, in south-central Poland. It lies approximately 3 km (2 mi) west of Jędrzejów and 38 km (24 mi) south-west of the regional capital Kielce.
