= Wilanów (disambiguation) =

Wilanów is a district of Warsaw.

Wilanów may also refer to:

- Wilanów Palace, a former royal residence
- Wilanów, Greater Poland Voivodeship (west-central Poland)
- Wilanów, Świętokrzyskie Voivodeship (south-central Poland)
- Wilanów, Lubusz Voivodeship (west Poland)
