= Kozłów, Świętokrzyskie Voivodeship =

Kozłów
- Village
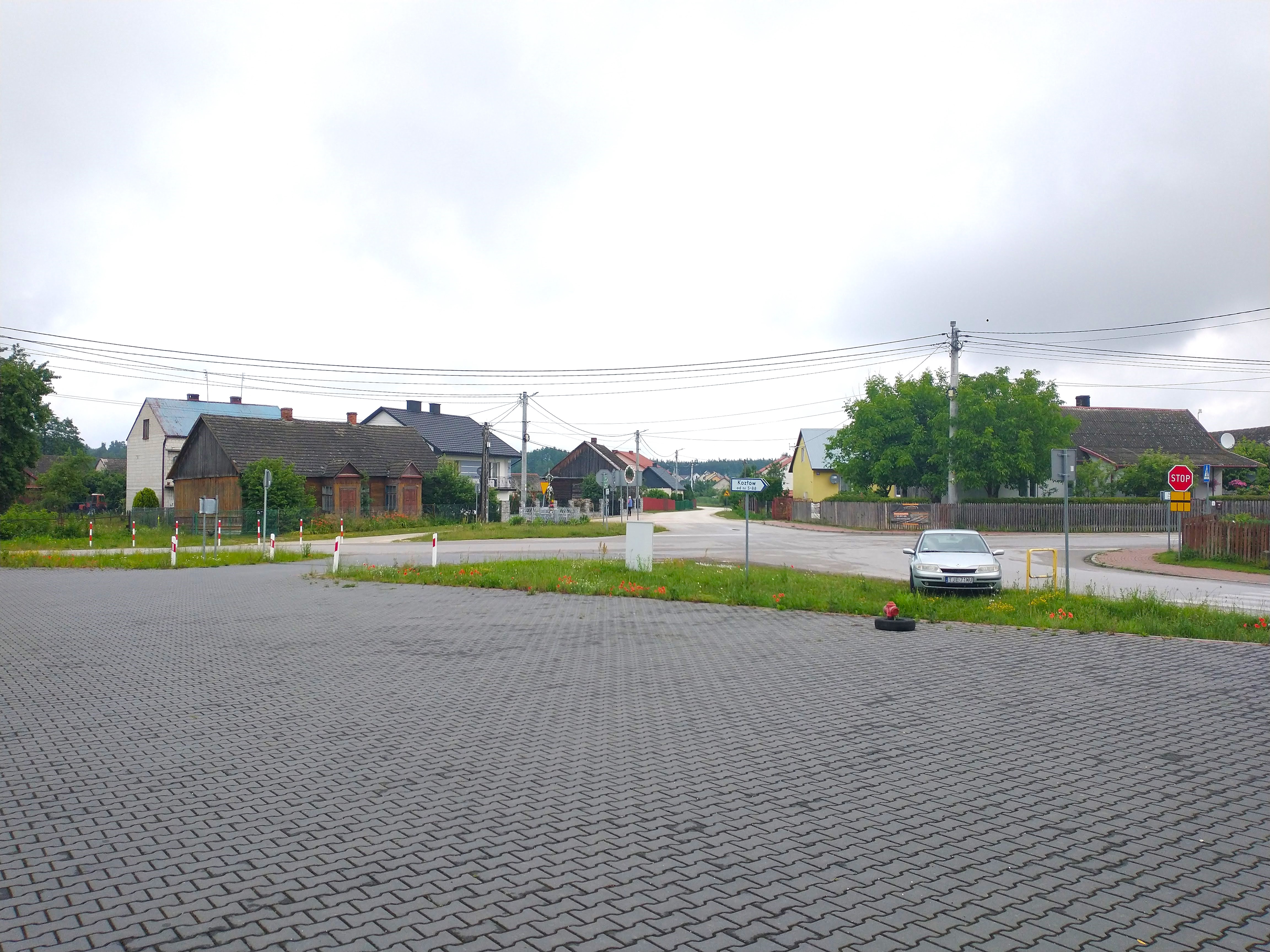

- Location within Poland
- Coordinates: 50°49′34″N 20°9′40″E
- Country: Poland
- Voivodeship: Świętokrzyskie
- County: Jędrzejów
- Gmina: Małogoszcz
- Population: 900

Kozłów [ˈkɔzwuf] is a village in the administrative district of Gmina Małogoszcz, within Jędrzejów County, Świętokrzyskie Voivodeship, in south-central Poland. It lies approximately 8 km (5 mi) west of Małogoszcz, 24 km (15 mi) north-west of Jędrzejów, and 33 km (21 mi) west of the regional capital Kielce.
