= Sudół =

Sudół may refer to the following places:

- Sudół, Jędrzejów County in Świętokrzyskie Voivodeship (south-central Poland)
- Sudół, Ostrowiec County in Świętokrzyskie Voivodeship (south-central Poland)
- Sudół, Pińczów County in Świętokrzyskie Voivodeship (south-central Poland)
