= Rembieszyce =

- Village
- Location within Poland
- Coordinates: 50°45′32″N 20°17′43″E
- Country: Poland
- Voivodeship: Świętokrzyskie
- County: Jędrzejów
- Gmina: Małogoszcz
- Population: 320

Rembieszyce [rɛmbjɛˈʂɨt͡sɛ] is a village in the administrative district of Gmina Małogoszcz, within Jędrzejów County, Świętokrzyskie Voivodeship, in south-central Poland. It lies approximately 7 km (4 mi) south of Małogoszcz, 14 km (9 mi) north of Jędrzejów, and 27 km (17 mi) south-west of the regional capital Kielce.
