= Chorzewa =

- Village
- Location within Poland
- Coordinates: 50°41′N 20°14′E
- Country: Poland
- Voivodeship: Świętokrzyskie
- County: Jędrzejów
- Gmina: Jędrzejów

Chorzewa [xɔˈʐɛva] is a village in the administrative district of Gmina Jędrzejów, within Jędrzejów County, Świętokrzyskie Voivodeship, in south-central Poland. It lies approximately 8 km (5 mi) north-west of Jędrzejów and 35 km (22 mi) south-west of the regional capital Kielce.
