= Wolica, Jędrzejów County =

Wolica
- Village
- Location within Poland
- Coordinates: 50°37′50″N 20°22′3″E
- Country: Poland
- Voivodeship: Świętokrzyskie
- County: Jędrzejów
- Gmina: Jędrzejów

Wolica [vɔˈlit͡sa] is a village in the administrative district of Gmina Jędrzejów, within Jędrzejów County, Świętokrzyskie Voivodeship, in south-central Poland. It lies approximately 5 km (3 mi) east of Jędrzejów and 34 km (21 mi) south-west of the regional capital Kielce.
