= Łysaków Kawęczyński =

- Village
- Location within Poland
- Coordinates: 50°35′24″N 20°19′29″E
- Country: Poland
- Voivodeship: Świętokrzyskie
- County: Jędrzejów
- Gmina: Jędrzejów

Łysaków Kawęczyński (Polish pronunciation: [wɨˈsakuf kavɛnˈtʂɨj̃skʲi]) is a village in the administrative district of Gmina Jędrzejów, within Jędrzejów County, Świętokrzyskie Voivodeship, in south-central Poland. It lies approximately 6 km (4 mi) south of Jędrzejów and 39 km (24 mi) south-west of the regional capital Kielce.
