= Brynica Sucha =

- Village
- Location within Poland
- Coordinates: 50°37′43″N 20°13′16″E
- Country: Poland
- Voivodeship: Świętokrzyskie
- County: Jędrzejów
- Gmina: Jędrzejów

Brynica Sucha [brɨˈnit͡sa ˈsuxa] is a village in the administrative district of Gmina Jędrzejów, within Jędrzejów County, Świętokrzyskie Voivodeship, in south-central Poland. It lies approximately 6 km (4 mi) west of Jędrzejów and 40 km (25 mi) south-west of the regional capital Kielce.
