= Stanisław Konarski =

Polish pedagogue, educational reformer, political writer, poet, dramatist and priest

Stanisław Konarski, Sch.P.
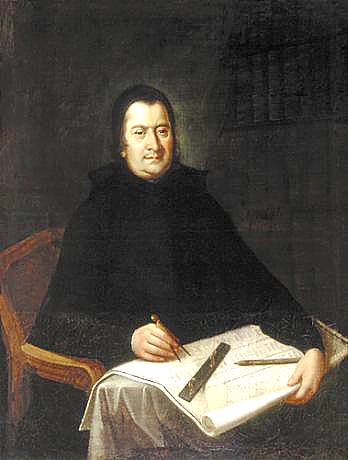
- anonymous portrait
- Born: 30 September 1700; Żarczyce Duże, Polish–Lithuanian Commonwealth
- Died: 3 August 1773 (aged 72); Warsaw, Polish–Lithuanian Commonwealth
- Occupation(s): Poet, dramatist

Stanisław Konarski, Sch.P. (actual name: Hieronim Konarski; 30 September 1700 – 3 August 1773) was a Polish pedagogue, educational reformer, political writer, poet, dramatist, Piarist priest and precursor of the Enlightenment in the Polish–Lithuanian Commonwealth.

Konarski was born in Żarczyce Duże, Świętokrzyskie Voivodeship. He studied from 1725 to 1727 at the Collegium Nazarenum in Rome, where he became a teacher of rhetoric. After that he travelled through France, Germany and Austria and Poland to broaden his education.

In 1730 he returned to Poland and began work on a new edition of Polish law, the Volumina legum.

From 1736 he taught at the Collegium Resoviense in Rzeszów. In 1740 he founded the Collegium Nobilium, an elite Warsaw school for sons of the gentry (szlachta). He founded the first public-reference library on the European mainland in 1747 in Warsaw. Thereafter he reformed Piarist education in Poland, in accordance with his educational program, the Ordinationes Visitationis Apostolicae... (1755). His reforms became a landmark in the 18th-century struggle to modernize the Polish education system.

Early on, Konarski was associated politically with King Stanisław Leszczyński; later, with the Czartoryski "Familia" and King Stanisław August Poniatowski. He participated in the latter's famous "Thursday dinners." Stanisław August caused a medal to be struck in Konarski's honour, with his likeness and the motto, from Horace, Sapere auso ("Dare to know!"). Konarski argued very strongly that the right of veto that had traditionally been exercised by the Polish Nobility was not law but a custom.

In his most important work, the four-part O skutecznym rad sposobie albo o utrzymywaniu ordynaryinych seymów (On an effective way of councils or on the conduct of ordinary sejms, 1760-1763), he unveiled a far-reaching reform program for the Polish parliamentary system and political reorganization of the Commonwealth's central government, which included aiding the monarch with a permanent governing council.

Konarski died, aged 72, in Warsaw, Poland. His heart is buried in an urn in the Piarist church in Cracow. His bust can be seen at the entrance to the crypt of this church placed on ulica Świętego Jana.

== See also ==
- History of philosophy in Poland
