= Kulczyzna =

- Village
- Location within Poland
- Coordinates: 50°38′24″N 20°21′27″E
- Country: Poland
- Voivodeship: Świętokrzyskie
- County: Jędrzejów
- Gmina: Jędrzejów

Kulczyzna [kulˈt͡ʂɨzna] is a village in the administrative district of Gmina Jędrzejów, within Jędrzejów County, Świętokrzyskie Voivodeship, in south-central Poland. It lies approximately 5 km (3 mi) east of Jędrzejów and 33 km (21 mi) south-west of the regional capital Kielce.
