= Kozłów =

Kozłów may refer to:

== Places ==
- Kozłów, Dąbrowa County in Lesser Poland Voivodeship (south Poland)
- Kozłów, Miechów County in Lesser Poland Voivodeship (south Poland)
- Kozłów, Bolesławiec County in Lower Silesian Voivodeship (south-west Poland)
- Kozłów, Wrocław County in Lower Silesian Voivodeship (south-west Poland)
- Kozłów, Gmina Radzanów in Masovian Voivodeship (east-central Poland)
- Kozłów, Gmina Wyśmierzyce in Masovian Voivodeship (east-central Poland)
- Kozłów, Garwolin County in Masovian Voivodeship (east-central Poland)
- Kozłów, Radom County in Masovian Voivodeship (east-central Poland)
- Kozłów, Podkarpackie Voivodeship (south-east Poland)
- Kozłów, Silesian Voivodeship (south Poland)
- Kozłów, Świętokrzyskie Voivodeship (south-central Poland)
- Kozliv (formerly Kozłów), a town in Ternopil Oblast (western Ukraine)

== People ==
- Richard Kozlow (1926-2008), American artist
