= Bocheniec, Świętokrzyskie Voivodeship =

Bocheniec
- Village
- Location within Poland
- Coordinates: 50°47′52″N 20°18′44″E
- Country: Poland
- Voivodeship: Świętokrzyskie
- County: Jędrzejów
- Gmina: Małogoszcz

Bocheniec [bɔˈxɛɲɛt͡s] is a village in the administrative district of Gmina Małogoszcz, within Jędrzejów County, Świętokrzyskie Voivodeship, in south-central Poland. It lies approximately 4 km (2 mi) south-east of Małogoszcz, 19 km (12 mi) north of Jędrzejów, and 24 km (15 mi) south-west of the regional capital Kielce.
