= Piaski, Jędrzejów County =

Piaski
- Village
- Location within Poland
- Coordinates: 50°37′49″N 20°19′46″E
- Country: Poland
- Voivodeship: Świętokrzyskie
- County: Jędrzejów
- Gmina: Jędrzejów

Piaski (Polish pronunciation: [ˈpjaskʲi]) is a village in the administrative district of Gmina Jędrzejów, within Jędrzejów County, Świętokrzyskie Voivodeship, in south-central Poland. It lies approximately 3 km (2 mi) east of Jędrzejów and 35 km (22 mi) south-west of the regional capital Kielce.
