= Ignacówka =

Ignacówka may refer to the following places:

- Ignacówka, Masovian Voivodeship (east-central Poland)
- Ignacówka, Sochaczew County in Masovian Voivodeship (east-central Poland)
- Ignacówka, Świętokrzyskie Voivodeship (south-central Poland)
