= Sudół, Jędrzejów County =

Sudół
- Village
- Location within Poland
- Coordinates: 50°39′29″N 20°15′21″E
- Country: Poland
- Voivodeship: Świętokrzyskie
- County: Jędrzejów
- Gmina: Jędrzejów

Sudół [ˈsuduu̯] is a village in the administrative district of Gmina Jędrzejów, within Jędrzejów County, Świętokrzyskie Voivodeship, in south-central Poland. It lies approximately 5 km (3 mi) north-west of Jędrzejów and 36 km (22 mi) south-west of the regional capital Kielce.
