= Helmut Kapp =

German Gestapo member (died 1943)

Helmut Kapp (born as Konstanty Kapuścik; died 31 May 1943) was a member of the Gestapo during World War II. He was killed in 1943 by a partisan death squad in Jędrzejów, Poland.

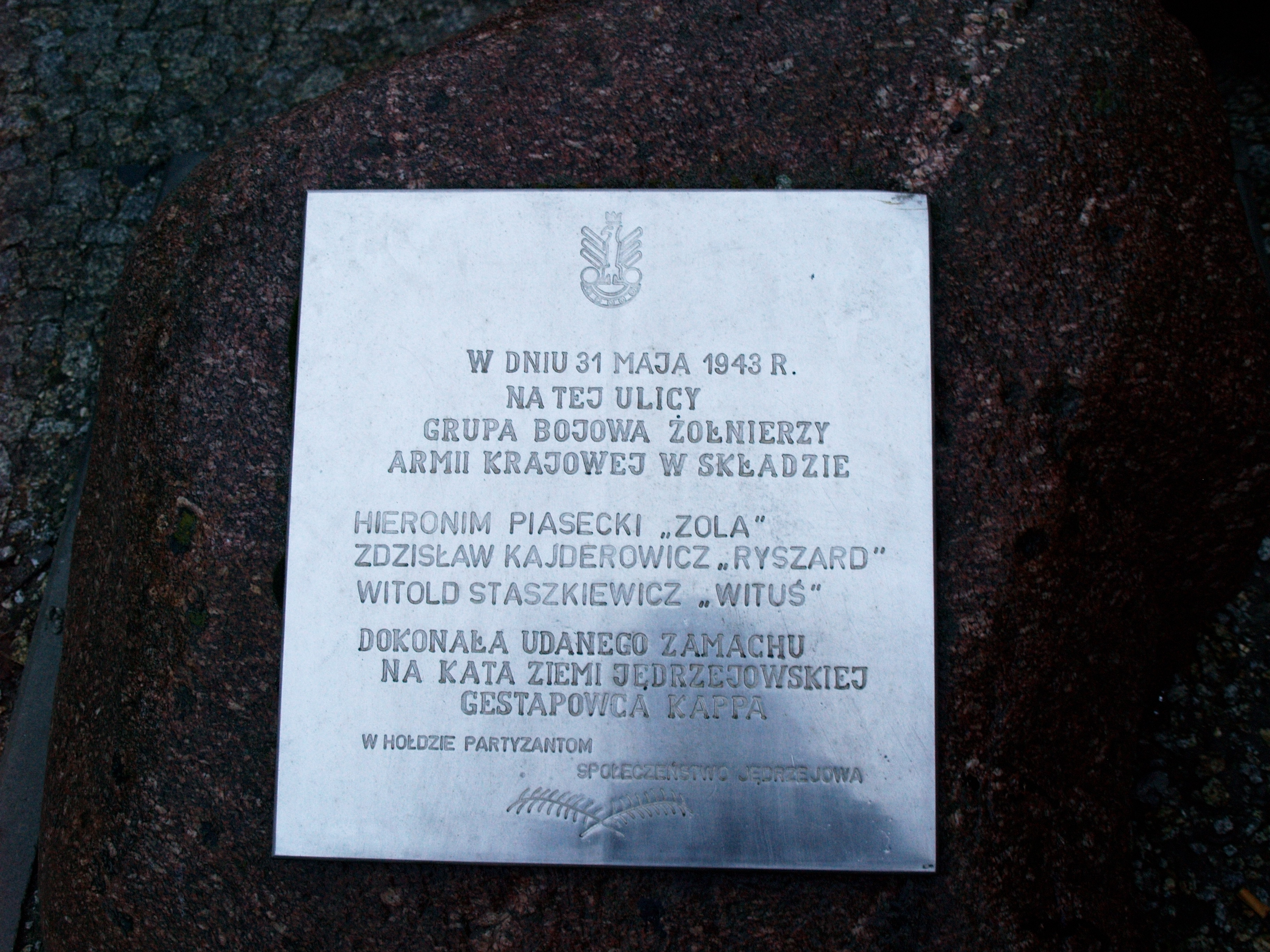
Text on the monument, which stands on the place where Helmut Kapp was killed

Kapp was born in Ratiborhammer, Upper Silesia. After the outbreak of World War II he joined the Gestapo. Initially a translator, he was promoted to the deputy commander of a Gestapo outpost in Jędrzejów. Among his tasks were recruitment of collaborators, assisting in the arrest of people in the powiats of Jędrzejów and Włoszczowa, and the interrogation of suspects arrested by the Germans. According to his own testimony, he murdered 452 Poles, including 365 Jews.

In the early months of 1943 Kapp was sentenced to death by the Polish Underground Special Courts for the Jędrzejów area and the verdict was supported by the local command of the Armia Krajowa. After several initial attempts to poison Kapp, the Armia Krajowa formed a death squad to kill him.

On 31 May 1943 the death squad was formed, composed of 2nd Lieutenant Zola, Corporal Ryszard and Private Wituś. The squad, armed with pistols, notified that Kapp was having a meeting at the gardens near the Gestapo building in Jędrzejów. They reached the gardens and found Kapp returning home with a German Gestapo driver. After a short fight, the driver was killed and Kapp was severely wounded. Kapp died the following day.

As a reprisal for this action, on 9 June 1943 the Germans killed 11 random civilians of Jędrzejów while an additional 25 were arrested, tortured and sent to Auschwitz concentration camp.
