= Zagaje, Świętokrzyskie Voivodeship =

Zagaje
- Village
- Location within Poland
- Coordinates: 50°33′57″N 20°19′21″E
- Country: Poland
- Voivodeship: Świętokrzyskie
- County: Jędrzejów
- Gmina: Jędrzejów

Zagaje [zaˈɡajɛ] is a village in the administrative district of Gmina Jędrzejów, within Jędrzejów County, Świętokrzyskie Voivodeship, in south-central Poland. It lies approximately 8 km (5 mi) south of Jędrzejów and 41 km (25 mi) south-west of the regional capital Kielce.
