= Łysaków Drugi =

Village in Gmina Jędrzejów, Poland

- Village
- Location within Poland
- Coordinates: 50°36′03″N 20°19′09″E
- Country: Poland
- Voivodeship: Świętokrzyskie
- County: Jędrzejów
- Gmina: Jędrzejów

Łysaków Drugi [wɨˈsakuf ˈdruɡi] is a village in the administrative district of Gmina Jędrzejów, within Jędrzejów County, Świętokrzyskie Voivodeship, in south-central Poland.
