= Gmina Jędrzejów =

Gmina Jędrzejów Jędrzejów Commune
- Gmina
- Coat of arms
- Interactive map of Gmina Jędrzejów
- Coordinates (Jędrzejów): 50°38′N 20°18′E
- Country: Poland
- Voivodeship: Świętokrzyskie
- County: Jędrzejów
- Seat: Jędrzejów

Area
  - Total: 227.52 km^{2} (87.85 sq mi)

Population (2006)
  - Total: 29,178
  - Density: 128.24/km^{2} (332.15/sq mi)
  - Urban: 16,577
  - Rural: 12,601
- Website: http://www.umjedrzejow.pl/

Gmina Jędrzejów is an urban-rural gmina (administrative district) in Jędrzejów County, Świętokrzyskie Voivodeship, in south-central Poland. Its seat is the town of Jędrzejów, which lies approximately 36 kilometres (22 mi) south-west of the regional capital Kielce.

The gmina covers an area of 227.52 square kilometres (87.8 sq mi), and as of 2006 its total population is 29,178 (out of which the population of Jędrzejów amounts to 16,577, and the population of the rural part of the gmina is 12,601).

== Villages ==
Apart from the town of Jędrzejów, Gmina Jędrzejów contains the villages and settlements of Borki, Borów, Brus, Brynica Sucha, Chorzewa, Chwaścice, Cierno-Zaszosie, Diament, Gozna, Ignacówka, Jasionna, Książe-Skroniów, Kulczyzna, Łączyn, Lasków, Lścin, Ludwinów, Łysaków Drugi, Łysaków Kawęczyński, Łysaków pod Lasem, Mnichów, Piaski, Podchojny, Podlaszcze, Potok Mały, Potok Wielki, Prząsław, Prząsław Mały, Przysów, Raków, Skroniów, Sudół, Węgleniec, Wilanów, Wolica, Wólka, Wygoda and Zagaje.

== Neighbouring gminas ==
Gmina Jędrzejów is bordered by the gminas of Imielno, Małogoszcz, Nagłowice, Oksa, Sędziszów, Sobków and Wodzisław.
