= Ignacówka, Świętokrzyskie Voivodeship =

Ignacówka
- Village
- Location within Poland
- Coordinates: 50°40′3″N 20°20′25″E
- Country: Poland
- Voivodeship: Świętokrzyskie
- County: Jędrzejów
- Gmina: Jędrzejów

Ignacówka [iɡnaˈt͡sufka] is a village in the administrative district of Gmina Jędrzejów, within Jędrzejów County, Świętokrzyskie Voivodeship, in south-central Poland. It lies approximately 5 km (3 mi) north-east of Jędrzejów and 31 km (19 mi) south-west of the regional capital Kielce.
