= Wilanów, Świętokrzyskie Voivodeship =

Wilanów
- Village
- Location within Poland
- Coordinates: 50°39′31″N 20°18′1″E
- Country: Poland
- Voivodeship: Świętokrzyskie
- County: Jędrzejów
- Gmina: Jędrzejów

Wilanów [viˈlanuf] is a village in the administrative district of Gmina Jędrzejów, within Jędrzejów County, Świętokrzyskie Voivodeship, in south-central Poland. It lies approximately 3.5 km (2 mi) north of Jędrzejów and 34 km (21 mi) south-west of the regional capital Kielce.
