= Przypkowscy Clock Museum =

Museum in Jędrzejów, Poland

Coordinates: 50°38′20″N 20°18′15″E

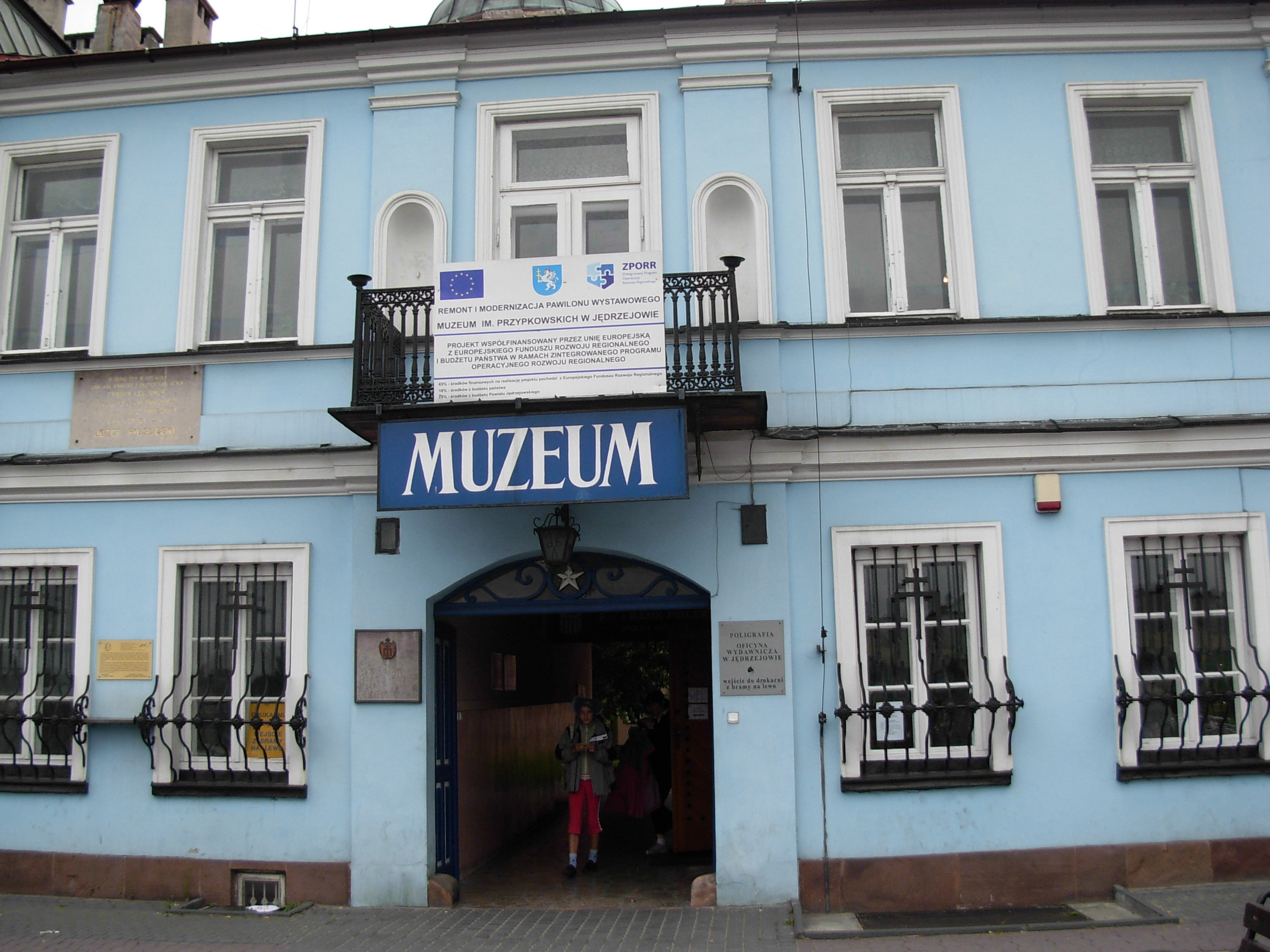
Main entrance

Przypkowscy Clock Museum (Polish: Państwowe Muzeum im. Przypkowskich w Jędrzejowie) is a clock museum in Jędrzejów, Poland. The museum was opened in 1909 to display Feliks Przypkowski's private collection of sundials and optical astronomical instruments, and was run by the Przypkowski family until 1962, when it became a state operated museum.

== Collections ==
The museum is housed in an old tenement building, with the interior decorated with 18th and 19th century rococo furnishings.

The museum holds a collection of almost 7,000 pieces, including clocks, watches, sundials, and optical astronomical instruments, cameras and old photographic equipment.

Despite the title of Clock Museum, the museum hosts a diverse collection, not just limited to clocks. There is also a section of the museum dedicated to gastronomy and the kitchen, with the first director of the museum, Tadeusz Przypkowski, having been passionate about cooking. Additionally, there is a collection of memorabilia relating to former Polish Prime Minister Józef Piłsudski, and a collection of photographs showing Jędrzejów at the beginning of the 20th century.

The museum is also home to a large library, with over 8,000 volumes. Notable works include Nicolaus Copernicus "De revolutinibus orbium coelestium" from 1566, and autographed copies of works by Hevelius, Descartes and Huygens.
