= Małogoszcz =

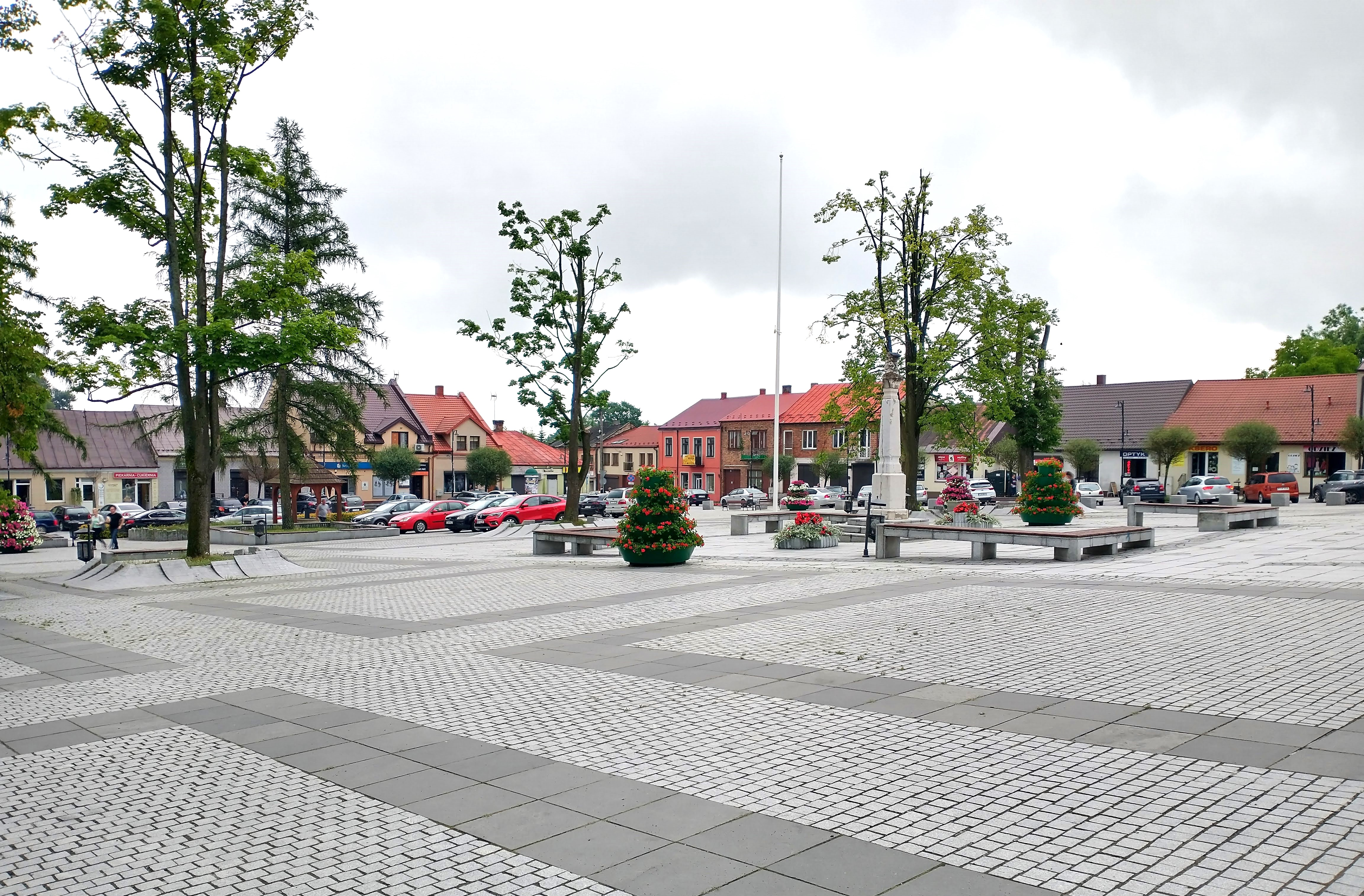
- Tadeusz Kościuszko Square

- Flag Coat of arms

- Location within Poland
- Coordinates: 50°48′48″N 20°16′6″E
- Country: Poland
- Voivodeship: Świętokrzyskie
- County: Jędrzejów
- Gmina: Małogoszcz
- Town rights: 1408

Area
  - Total: 9.61 km^{2} (3.71 sq mi)

Population (2012)
  - Total: 4,022
  - Density: 419/km^{2} (1,080/sq mi)
- Time zone: UTC+1 (CET)
  - Summer (DST): UTC+2 (CEST)
- Postal code: 28-366
- Area code: +48 41
- Vehicle registration: TJE
- Website: http://www.malogoszcz.pl/

Małogoszcz [maˈwɔɡɔʂt͡ʂ] is a town in the Jędrzejów County, Świętokrzyskie Voivodeship, in southern Poland. The Battle of Małogoszcz. one of the biggest battles of the 1863 January Uprising, took place there. Małogoszcz belongs to Lesser Poland; the name of the town comes from ancient Polish given name Małogost.

== History ==
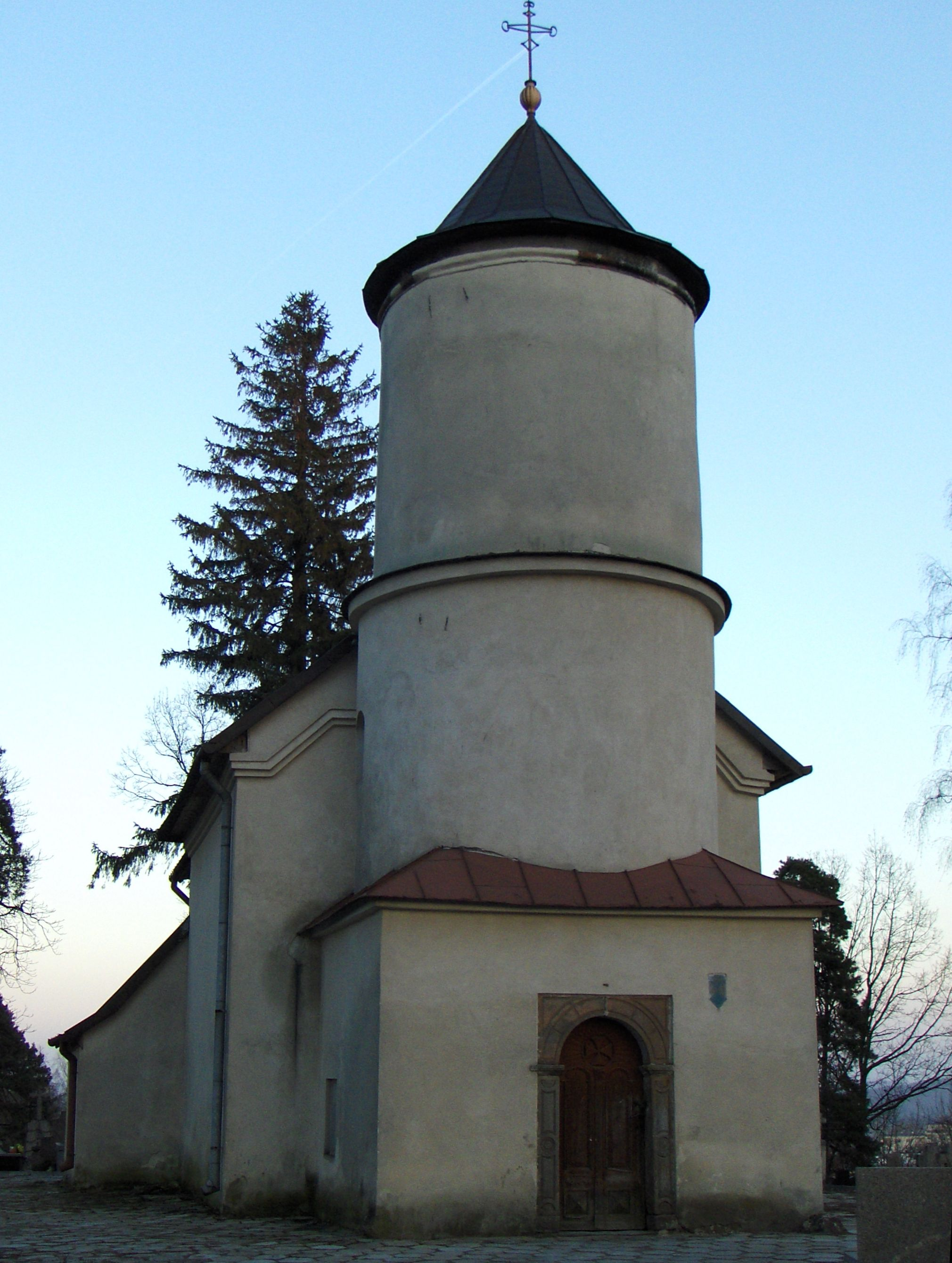
Saint Stanislaus church, built in the 16th century

Małogoszcz was founded in the early days of the Polish statehood as a settlement located at the intersection of medieval merchant routes. First mention of the village, which at that time was home to a castellan, comes from a papal bull of 1136. In the 12th century Małogoszcz was a local trade and administrative center. Małogost, as it was called, was frequently visited by Polish princes and kings. In 1140, Duchess of Poland Salomea of Berg came here, and in 1273 - Princess Kinga of Poland. In 1259, the gord was destroyed in a Mongol raid. In the 14th century, King Casimir III the Great built defensive fortifications here. In 1408 Małogoszcz was incorporated as a town, upon order of King Władysław II Jagiełło. It was a royal town of the Kingdom of Poland, administratively located in the Chęciny County in the Sandomierz Voivodeship in the Lesser Poland Province. In June 1582, King Stefan Batory spent a night here on his way to Warsaw for his crowning.

Małogoszcz prospered in the 16th and early 17th centuries. In 1591-1595 a Baroque church was built, and the town emerged as a center of cloth making. Before catastrophic Swedish invasion (the Deluge, 1655-1660), the town had 180 houses and the population of 1,200. By 1660, the population was reduced to 700. In June 1794, during the Kościuszko Uprising, Tadeusz Kościuszko rested here after the Battle of Szczekociny.

Following the Third Partition of Poland, it was annexed by Austria. After the Polish victory in the Austro-Polish War of 1809, it was regained by Poles and included within the short-lived Duchy of Warsaw, and after its dissolution in 1815, it fell to the Russian Partition of Poland. On February 24, 1863, one of the biggest battles of the January Uprising, the Battle of Małogoszcz, took place there. The headquarters of General Marian Langiewicz was located in a local parish church complex, and the Łosośna river' name was later changed into Wierna Rzeka (Faithful River). As a punishment, in 1869 the Russians demoted Małogoszcz to the status of a village. In 1904 a great fire destroyed large parts of it, and the village was completely destroyed in 1914-1915, when the Russian - Austro/German frontline remained here for several months.

Following World War I, in 1918, Poland regained independence and control of Małogoszcz. According to the 1921 census, Małogoszcz with the adjacent railway settlement had a population of 2,262, of which 87.2% declared Polish nationality and 12.8% declared Jewish nationality.

Following the German-Soviet invasion of Poland, which started World War II in September 1939, the town was occupied by Germany until January 1945. The Germans operated a forced labour camp for Jews in the town.

Małogoszcz recovered its town rights in 1996.

== Sights ==
Among points of interest there is the parish church (1591-1595), Renaissance parish complex, a cemetery chapel (1595), and a monument of Tadeusz Kościuszko (1917).

== Transport ==
Voivodeship road 728 bypasses Małogoszcz to the east.

Małogoszcz has a station on the Częstochowa-Kielce railway line.

== Sport ==
- Wierna Małogoszcz - football club
