= Jędrzejów =

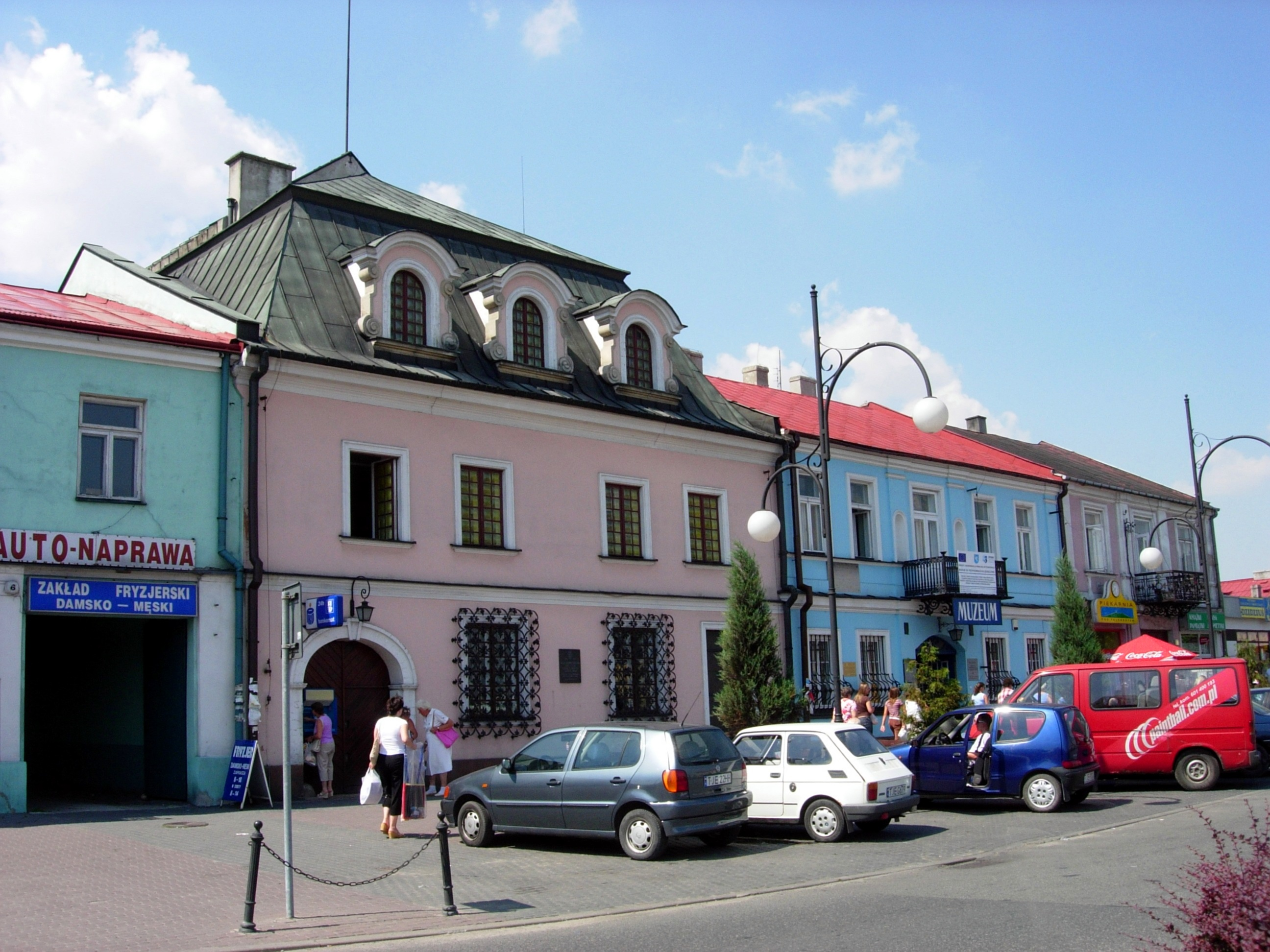
- Main square

- Coat of arms

- Location within Poland
- Coordinates: 50°38′N 20°18′E
- Country: Poland
- Voivodeship: Świętokrzyskie
- County: Jędrzejów
- Gmina: Jędrzejów
- Established: 7th-8th century
- First mentioned: 1153
- Town rights: 1271

Government
  - Mayor: Marcin Piszczek (PiS)

Area
  - Total: 11.37 km^{2} (4.39 sq mi)

Population (2011)
  - Total: 16,139
  - Density: 1,419/km^{2} (3,676/sq mi)
- Time zone: UTC+1 (CET)
  - Summer (DST): UTC+2 (CEST)
- Postal code: 28-300
- Area code: +48 41
- Car plates: TJE
- Website: http://www.umjedrzejow.pl/

Jędrzejów (Polish: [jɛnˈdʐɛjuf]; Yiddish: יענדזשעוו, romanized: Yendzshev, Latin: Andreiow) is a town in southern Poland, located in the Świętokrzyskie Voivodeship. It lies approximately 35 kilometres (22 miles) southwest of Kielce. It is the capital of Jędrzejów County. It has 16,139 inhabitants (2011).

== Etymology ==
The origin of the name of the town is unknown. Probably it was named after a man named Andrzej (Jędrzej), a member of the noble Lis family, which resided in this area.

== Location and transport ==
The town lies in historic province of Lesser Poland, 38 kilometres (24 miles) from Kielce, and 78 km (48 mi) from Kraków. Jędrzejów is located in Lesser Poland Upland, on two local rivers, the Jasionka and the Brzeznica. The area is hilly, with highest point being a hill called Gaj (301 metres (988 feet) above sea level). On December 31, 2010, the area of the town was 11.37 km^{2} (4.39 sq mi), and population density 1419 per km^{2}.

Jędrzejów lies next to European route E77, as well as National Road nr. 78 (Chałupki – Chmielnik), and two local roads, the 728th and the 768th. The town also lies on an important rail route from Kraków to Lublin and Warsaw. Close to Jędrzejów train station (Dworzec PKP) is a historic narrow-gauge station where a 750mm-gauge line (Świętokrzyska Kolej Dojazdowa) runs to Pińczów (part of a once extensive network of narrow-gauge railways in the region). There used to be an interchange with the standard-gauge line, and there are still remains of a turning triangle in the yards of both stations.

== History ==
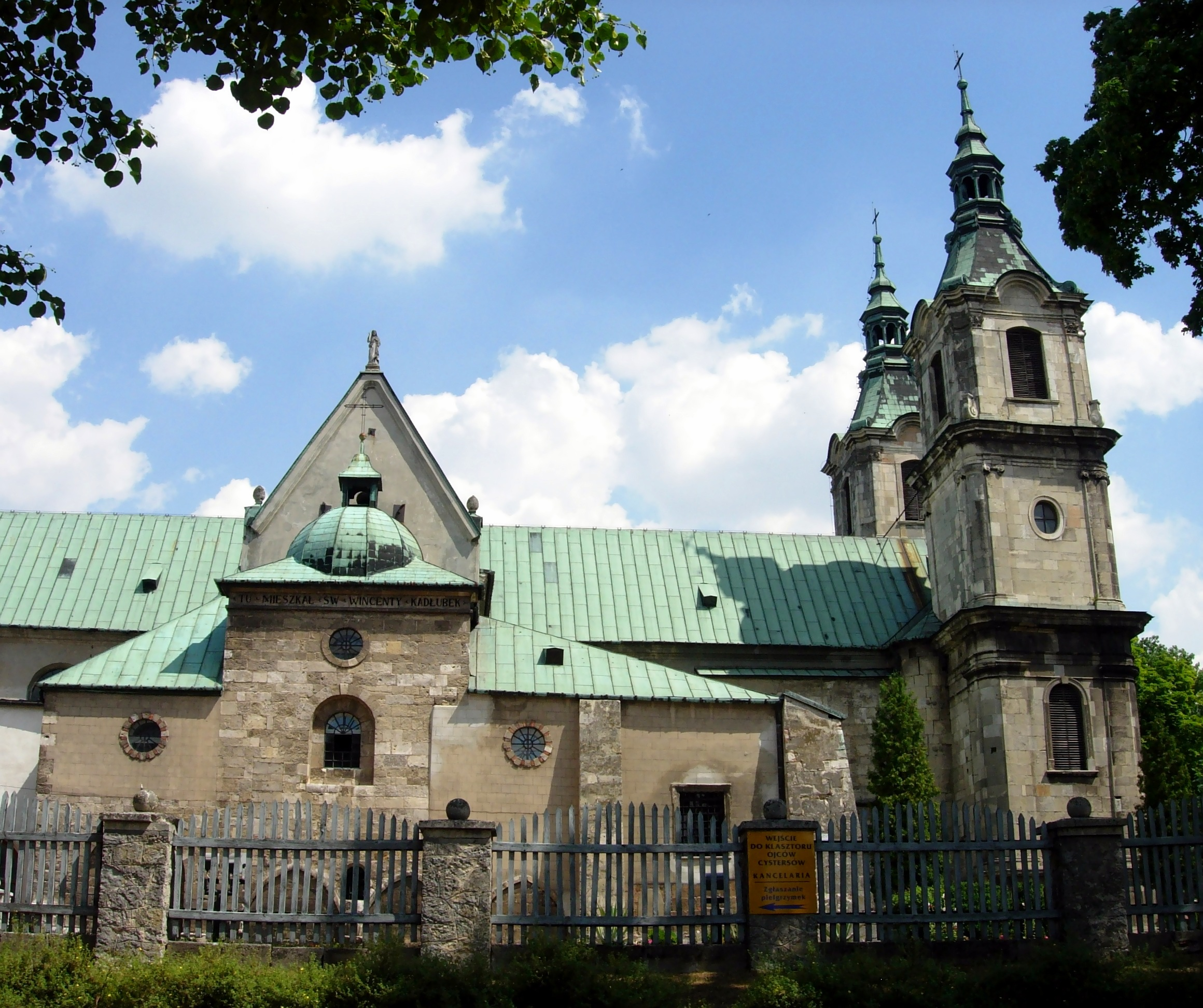
Cistercian Abbey in Jędrzejów

In the early years of the Kingdom of Poland, a settlement of Brzeznica existed in the location of Jędrzejów. It was first mentioned in the year 1153, in a document issued by Archbishop of Gniezno, Janik. In the document, foundation of a Cistercian monastery known today as the Blessed Wincenty Kadłubek Church. The monastery was founded by French Cistercians, who came to Jędrzejów from Morimond Abbey between 1143 and 1153. The location of the monastery, which was the village of Brzeznica, was spelled Brysinch. In the 12th century, the name of the village was changed into Jędrzejów, but one of the local rivers still bears the name Brzeznica.

In 1166, a council of the Piast dynasty dukes and bishops was organized at Jędrzejów, to honor the blessing of the parish church of Saint Adalbert of Prague, which had been remodelled by the Cistercians. In a document mentioning this event, the names Andrzeiow, Andreiow and Andreow appear. Jędrzejów was located on the boundary between two provinces of Lesser Poland – Land of Kraków and Land of Sandomierz. The boundary was marked by the Nida river. In 1195, during the medieval so called Fragmentation of Poland (see History of Poland during the Piast dynasty), a battle between two dukes - Leszek the White of Kraków and Sandomierz and Mieszko the Old of Poznań took place here.

In 1218, Bishop Wincenty Kadłubek resigned from his post and settled in the Jędrzejów Monastery, where he died in 1223. In the course of the time, pilgrims began to visit his tomb, among those who prayed here, was King John III Sobieski on the way to the Battle of Vienna.

The village was granted Magdeburg rights on February 16, 1271, by Duke Bolesław V the Chaste. The town charter was confirmed by several Polish kings, including Sigismund I the Old, who in 1510 allowed for weekly fairs and three markets a year. Jędrzejów prospered, with a town hall and other public buildings constructed here in the 15th and 16th century, during the Polish Golden Age. In 1581, the town had 77 artisans, including 20 shoemakers, 10 bakers and 5 butchers. Jędrzejów traded with the city of Kraków, where it sold local products, such as bee wax, honey and tar. In January 1576, supporters of Stephen Báthory called a council at Jędrzejów, as the town was an important administrative centers, where sejmiks took place. Jędrzejów was captured, looted and destroyed by Swedish army of King Charles XII, during the Great Northern War. Furthermore, in the mid-18th century, large parts of the monastery burned down, to be rebuilt in Baroque style. In the 1790s, during the Kościuszko Uprising, Tadeusz Kościuszko stationed here before the Battle of Szczekociny, meeting Józef Poniatowski (June 27, 1794). Following the Third Partition of Poland (1795), Jędrzejów was annexed by Austria and included within the newly formed province of West Galicia. Following the Austro-Polish War of 1809 it was regained by Poles and included within the short-lived Duchy of Warsaw, and after its dissolution, from 1815 to 1915 it was part of Russian-controlled Congress Poland.

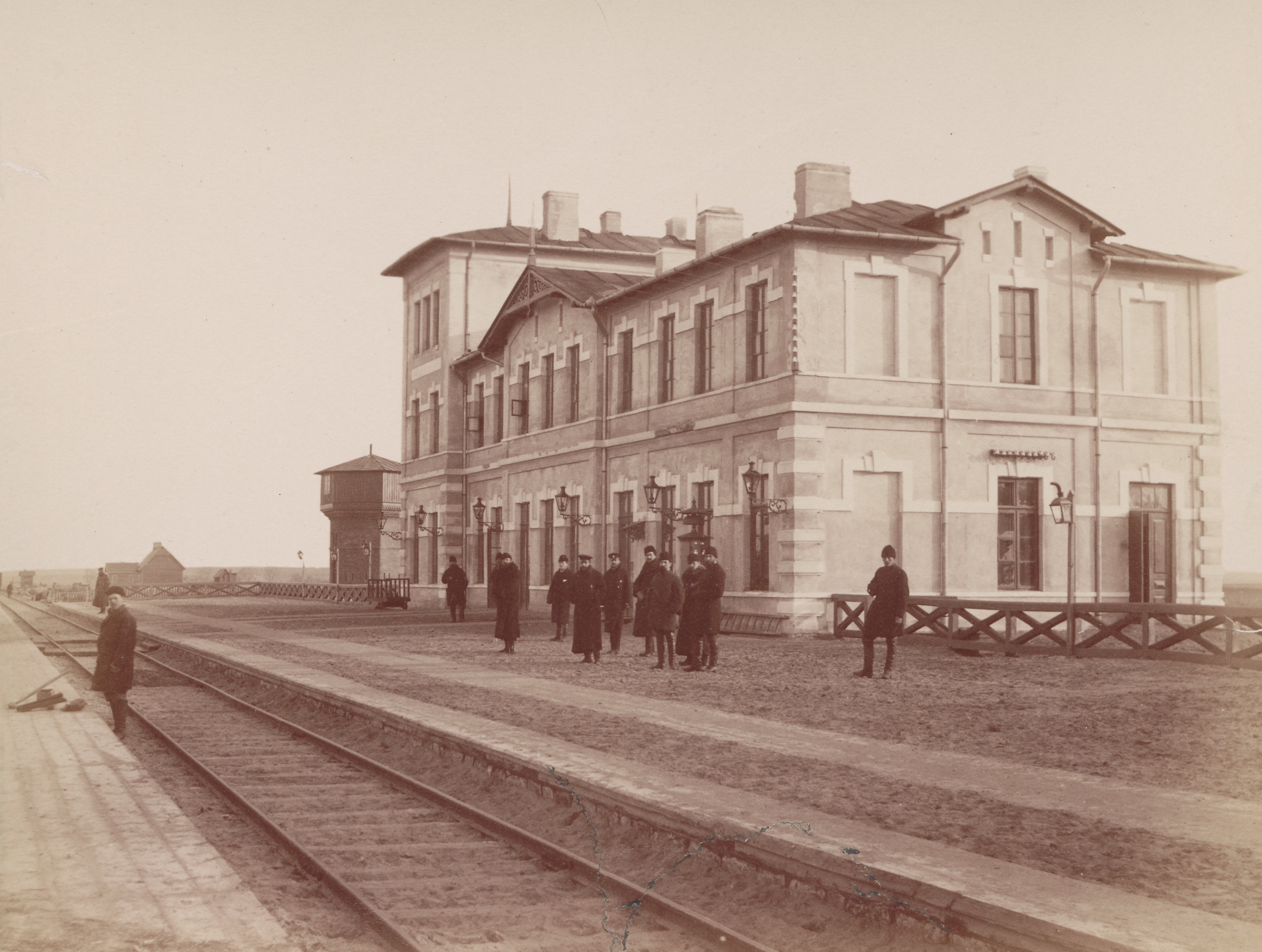
Railway station in 1885

In 1819, the abbey was closed, but monks dwelled in the complex until 1855, when last Cistercian monk, Wilhelm Ulawski, died. In 1858, Franciscans moved in, but Russians kicked them out in 1870, opening a teachers college in the monastery. The Cistercians did not return until 1945. Residents of Jędrzejów actively supported November Uprising, in the cellars of the monastery a Polish military hospital was opened, with 400 beds. The area of the town was one of centers of the January Uprising, with more than 30 battles and skirmishes with the Russians taking place here. In 1867 Jędrzejów became the seat of a county, but in 1870 Russian government stripped it of the town charter, turning Jędrzejów into a village (which it remained until 1916).

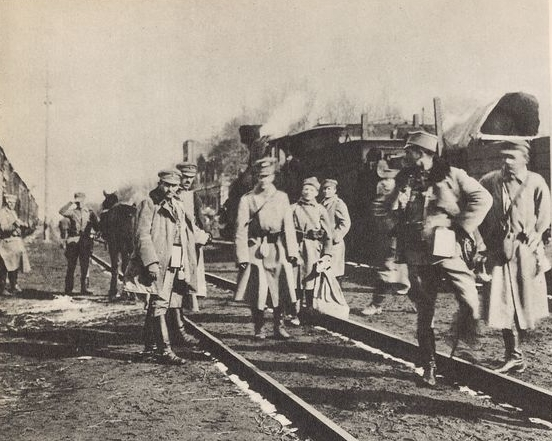
1st Brigade of the Polish Legions in Jędrzejów in 1915

On March 3, 1915, Jędrzejów was visited by Józef Piłsudski, and this event is commemorated by a marble tablet. Following World War I, Poland regained independence and control of the town. Within the Second Polish Republic, the town belonged to Kielce Voivodeship.

=== World War II ===
During the German-Soviet invasion of Poland, which started World War II in September 1939, Jędrzejów was not destroyed. The town fell under German occupation, however, the Polish resistance movement was active in the town. Jędrzejów was an important center of the Home Army (see also Republic of Pińczów). The underground University of the Western Lands gave secret lectures. The secret Polish Council to Aid Jews "Żegota", established by the Polish resistance operated in the town. From November 1942 to March 1943, the Germans operated a forced labour camp for Jews in the town. The local Jewish minority was murdered by the Germans in the Holocaust. In 1943, the Polish resistance successfully assassinated Helmut Kapp, commander of the local Gestapo unit. Red Army units entered the town on January 14, 1945, and afterwards it was restored to Poland.

== Economy and tourism ==
Jędrzejów is a local center of services and cement industry. The town also has a brewery, whose traditions date back to the late 18th century. Jędrzejów is known for its Przypkowscy Clock Museum, opened in 1962, which has the world's third largest collection of sundials behind the Adler Planetarium in Chicago and the History of Science Museum in Oxford. It has one hotel which doubles as a student accommodation. The town has two historic churches, with parish church of Wincenty Kadłubek dating back to the 12th century. The monastery was founded by the Gryfita family in the mid-12th century. It was rebuilt several times – in 1166, in the mid-15th century, and in the late 18th century. South of Jędrzejów, there is a 100 metres tall lattice tower used for radio relay links. There is also a narrow-gauge railway which runs to Pińczów during the summer.

== Demographics ==
Historical population

Year	Pop.	±%
1921	11,732	—
1931	12,853	+9.6%
1939	14,600	+13.6%

Year	Pop.	±%
1950	11,039	−24.4%
1960	12,580	+14.0%
2010	16,139	+28.3%

== Notable people ==
- Rafał Grzyb (born 1983), footballer
- Wincenty Kadłubek (c. 1150–1223), chronicler; lived and died here

== Sport ==
- Naprzód Jędrzejów – football club
- Łukasz Obrzut – Former college (USA) and professional basketball player
