= Miąsowa =

- Village
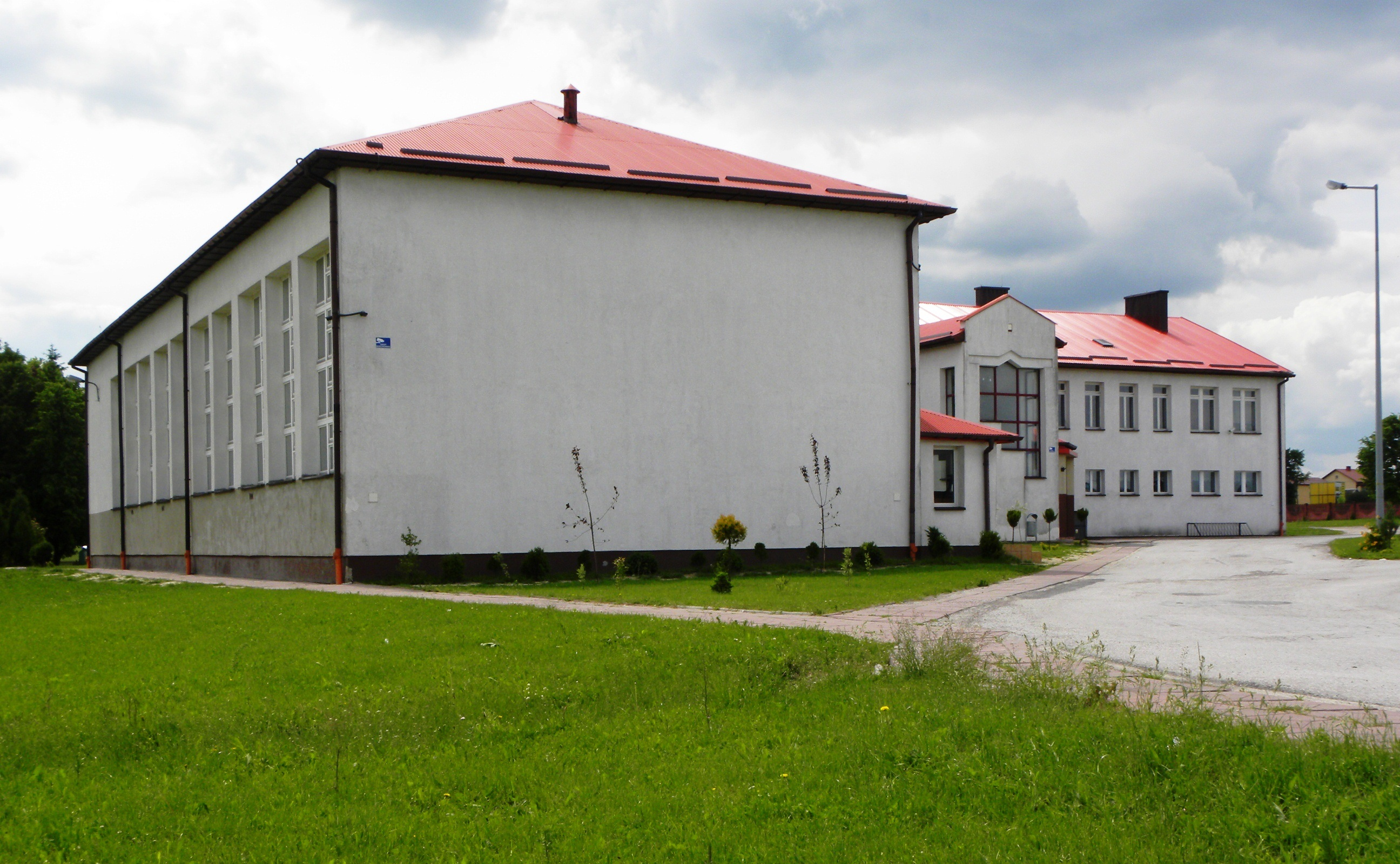
- School in Miąsowa

- Location within Poland
- Coordinates: 50°43′3″N 20°22′17″E
- Country: Poland
- Voivodeship: Świętokrzyskie
- County: Jędrzejów
- Gmina: Sobków
- Population: 675

Miąsowa [mjɔ̃ˈsɔva] is a village in the administrative district of Gmina Sobków, within Jędrzejów County, Świętokrzyskie Voivodeship, in south-central Poland. It lies approximately 7 km (4 mi) west of Sobków, 11 km (7 mi) north-east of Jędrzejów, and 26 km (16 mi) south-west of the regional capital Kielce. In village are located railway station on the trail Kielce - Kraków, school, library, day room, health center, pharmacy and three grocery shops.

In 2013 675 people lived in Miąsowa.

Integral parts of Miąsowa
| Bacis place | Place ID | Place name | Kind of place |
|---|---|---|---|
| Miąsowa | 0270403 | Chabasów | part of place |
| Miąsowa | 0270410 | Kajtanów | part of place |
| Miąsowa | 0270426 | Lipówka | part of place |
| Miąsowa | 0270432 | Pećkelów | hamlet |

== History ==
=== 16th century ===
In 1540 the village was called Miąszowa (Miąsowa) and places Mzurowa, Mnichów and Osowa were owned by Jan Michowski. The value of the four villages was 1000 grzywnas.

=== 19th century ===
In the 19th century the village was called Miąsowa and was in Jędrzejów County, Gmina Brzegi, Mnichów parish.

In 1827 were 13 houses and 77 villagers.

=== World War I ===
In 1915 Austrians took to Miąsowa a howitzer called Chuda Emma. They installed it behind a 19th-century tavern. For safety villagers had to leave a place. From cannon with 10 km (6 mi) range shot to Russian artillery points (mainly to villages Mosty, Korzecko and Tokarnia). Austrian bombardment with so powerful cannon caused counterattack and Miąsowa was completely destroyed in one day. That people who haven't got place to live returned to ruins of their houses. In village was misery. After the war was slowly time to re-build of Miąsowa with help from gmina Brzegi. On February 28, 1919 Diet passed a law of supply villagers in wood.

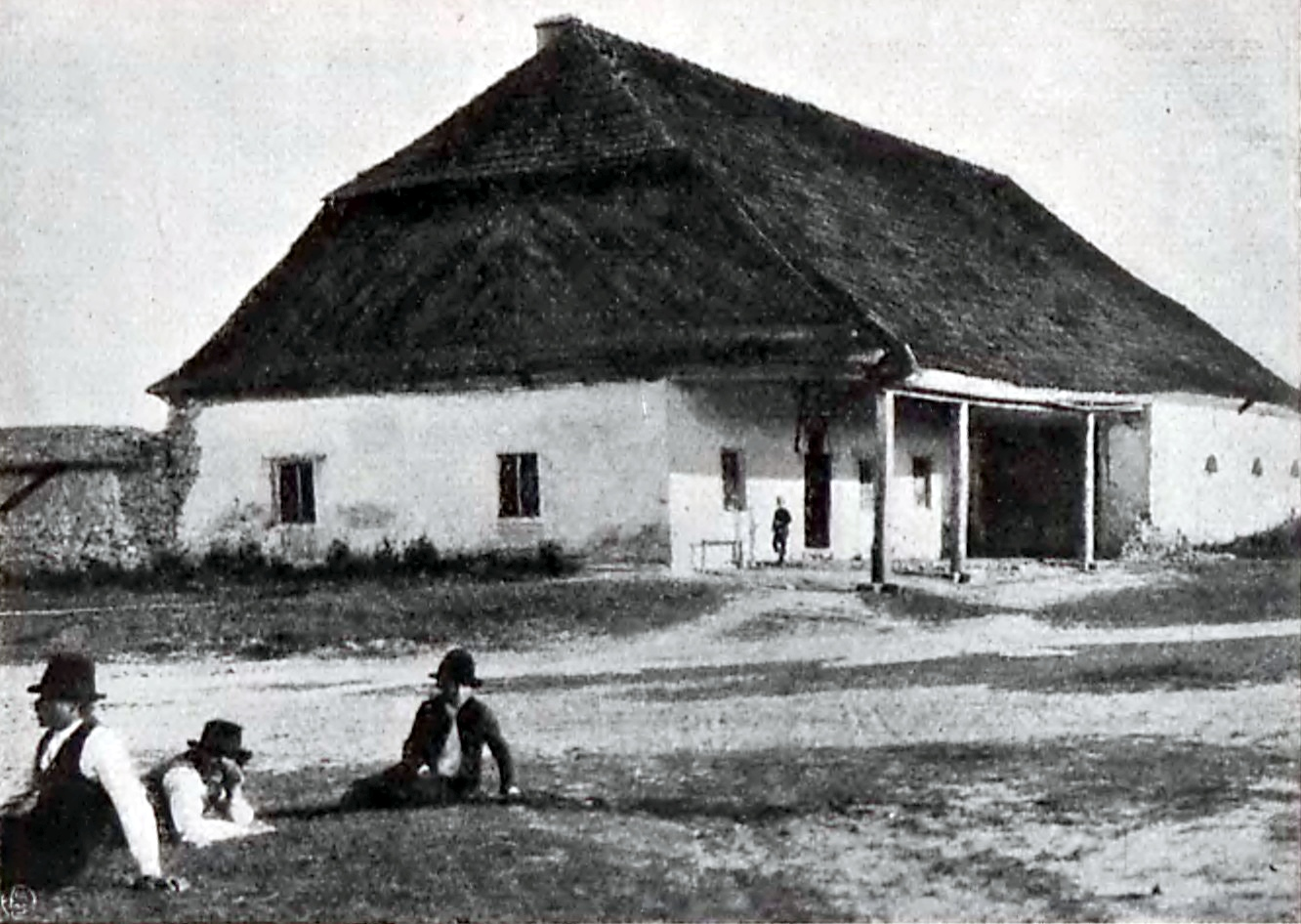
19th-century tavern in Miąsowa.

=== World War II ===
On 30 January 1944 branch called 'Barabasz' blew up railroad track on the trail Miąsowa-Sobków. Jędrzejów gestapo arrested a lot of people from Jędrzejów(several men was in AK). Captured men were transported to Kielce and on 31 January gestapo moved them to action place in Miąsowa. 24 prisoners were killed. In 1965 authorities of Polish People's Republic placed a monument of murdered people.

=== Techno Party ===
On 6 August - 9 August in the forest near Miąsowa unexpectedly was a techno party. Then came over 1000 people from most of Europe countries. The meeting took place without the consent of the authorities or landowners. Music was coming out of the speakers arranged in a line on a length of about half kilometer. Loud noises and halogen lights attracted residents of nearby villages. Several locals decided to earn money by carrying beer by cars. They sold alcohol well because the nearest shop was a long way from there. After party newcomers tidied a place. Since then it happens every year in early August.

== Education ==
Since October 25, 1997 Team Institutions Educational (primary school and secondary school) works here. Since January 2, 2000 there is gym. Building takes 2650 square meters. In the school year 2008/09 to school went 154 students of primary school and 181 students of secondary school. Before children learned in old school (does not exist now). Wife of the heir Jaskółkowski gave it to Miąsowa.

== Demography ==
From 31 December 2013:

| Opis | Total | | Women | | Men | |
|---|---|---|---|---|---|---|
| unit | osób | % | osób | % | osób | % |
| population | 675 | 100 | 342 | 51 | 333 | 49 |
