= Bizorędki =

- Village
- Location within Poland
- Coordinates: 50°44′52″N 20°20′50″E
- Country: Poland
- Voivodeship: Świętokrzyskie
- County: Jędrzejów
- Gmina: Sobków

Bizorędki [bizɔˈrɛndki] is a village in the administrative district of Gmina Sobków, within Jędrzejów County, Świętokrzyskie Voivodeship, in south-central Poland. It lies approximately 10 km (6 mi) north-west of Sobków, 14 km (9 mi) north of Jędrzejów, and 25 km (16 mi) south-west of the regional capital Kielce. Adjacents with Bizoręda.

== History ==
In 1827 y. was 12 houses and 60 villagers.
