= Sokołów =

Sokołów may refer to the following places in Poland:

- Sokołów, district of the city of Łódź
- Sokołów Podlaski, seat of Sokołów County in Masovian Voivodeship (east-central Poland)
- Sokołów County, in Masovian Voivodeship (east-central Poland)
- Sokołów Małopolski, town in Subcarpathian Voivodeship (south-east Poland)
- Sokołów, Skierniewice County in Łódź Voivodeship (central Poland)
- Sokołów, Gmina Goszczanów in Łódź Voivodeship (central Poland)
- Sokołów, Gmina Sieradz in Łódź Voivodeship (central Poland)
- Sokołów, Gostynin County in Masovian Voivodeship (central Poland)
- Sokołów, Pruszków County in Masovian Voivodeship (east-central Poland)
- Sokołów, Lubusz Voivodeship (west Poland)
- Sokołów, West Pomeranian Voivodeship (north-west Poland)

== See also ==
- Sokołów Dolny
- Sokołów Górny
- Nowy Sokołów
- Stary Sokołów
- Sokolov (surname)
- Sokoloff, surname
