= Franz Woidich =

German World War II fighter pilot (1921–2004)

- Woidich as Leutnant
- Born: 2 January 1921; Znojmo, Czechoslovakia
- Died: 5 July 2004 (aged 83); Mainz, Germany
- Military career
- Allegiance: Nazi Germany
- Branch: Luftwaffe
- Rank: Oberleutnant of the Reserves
- Units: JG 27, JG 52, JG 400
- Commands: 3./JG 52, 7./JG 400
- Conflicts: See battles World War II: North African Campaign; Eastern Front; Battle of Kursk; Defense of the Reich
- Awards: Knight's Cross of the Iron Cross
- Other work: Ingenieurbüro Woidich

Franz-Walter Woidich (2 January 1921 – 5 July 2004) was a Luftwaffe flying ace of World War II. He was credited with 110 aerial victories claimed in roughly 1000 combat missions.

Born in Znojmo, present-day in the Czech Republic, Woidich joined the Luftwaffe in early 1940. After flight and fighter pilot training was posted to 5. Staffel (5th Squadron) of Jagdgeschwader 27 (JG 27–27th Fighter Wing) in July 1941. Woidich claimed his first aerial victories over North Africa in late 1941. In April 1942, he was transferred to Jagdgeschwader 52 (JG 52–52nd Fighter Wing) which fought on Eastern Front. On 11 June 1943, Woidich was appointed Staffelkapitän (squadron leader) of 3. Staffel of JG 52. A year later, he received the coveted Knight's Cross of the Iron Cross, the highest award in the military and paramilitary forces of Nazi Germany during World War II. On 20 July, Woidich was credited with his 100th aerial victory. He was then transferred to Jagdgeschwader 400 (JG 400–400th Fighter Wing), flying the Messerschmitt Me 163 rocket powered aircraft.

Following World War II, Woidich became an engineer and founded an automotive technical engineering bureau, in Mainz-Kastel. He died on 27 July 1984 at the age of 83 in Mainz, Germany.

== Early life and career ==
Woidich was born on 2 January 1921 in Znojmo (Znaim), present-day in the Czech Republic, at the time in the bilingual region of southern Moravia of the First Czechoslovak Republic. He joined the Luftwaffe in early 1940 and following flight and fighter pilot training, (Note: Flight training in the Luftwaffe progressed through the levels A1, A2 and B1, B2, referred to as A/B flight training. A training included theoretical and practical training in aerobatics, navigation, long-distance flights and dead-stick landings. The B courses included high-altitude flights, instrument flights, night landings and training to handle the aircraft in difficult situations.) Woidich was posted to 5. Staffel (5th Squadron) of Jagdgeschwader 27 (JG 27–27th Fighter Wing) on 11 July 1941. In July 1941, 5. Staffel was commanded by Hauptmann Ernst Düllberg and subordinated to II. Gruppe (2nd group) of JG 27 headed by Hauptmann Wolfgang Lippert. The Gruppe had just been withdrawn from combat operations on the Eastern Front and was based at Vilna. On 24 July, the Gruppe arrived at Döberitz, located approximately 10 kilometers (6.2 miles) west of Staaken, for a period of rest and replenishment.

== World War II ==
On Friday 1 September 1939 German forces had invaded Poland which marked the beginning of World War II. Based at Döberitz, II. Gruppe began conversion training to the Messerschmitt Bf 109 F-4 on 18 August 1941 and prepared for combat in North Africa to support a German contingent, the Deutsche Afrika Korps under the command of Erwin Rommel. On 24 September, 5. Staffel under command of Düllberg began the relocation, arriving at Ayn al-Ġazāla on 1 October. On 21 November during the Siege of Tobruk, Woidich filed his first aerial victory claim which was not approved. In combat with the Royal Air Force (RAF) No. 250 Squadron, each side claimed one victory but no aircraft were lost in this engagement. Woidich had claimed a Curtiss P-40 Warhawk fighter shot down 7 kilometers (4.3 miles) south of Ain el Gazala.

The next day, he was credited with his aerial victory when he shot down a Royal Australian Air Force P-40 northwest of Bir Hakeim. On 12 December, Woidich lost his Bf 109 F-4 trop (Werknummer 8427—factory number) when the engine caught fire during start procedure. The aircraft was severely damaged and had to be blown up at Derna. On 12 February 1942, Woidich engaged in combat with Curtiss P-40 Kittyhawk fighters from No. 73 and No. 274 Squadron from the RAF in the vicinity of Tobruk on a Junkers Ju 87 dive-bomber escort mission. In this aerial encounter, he claimed a P-40 shot down 15 kilometres (9.3 miles) southwest of Fort Acroma. On 15 March 1942, Woidich claimed a P-40 shot down in combat with No. 450 Squadron RAAF, No. 260 Squadron RAF and 2 Squadron SAAF. The combat occurred 20 kilometres (12 miles) southeast of Ain el Gazala. This was his second confirmed aerial victory.

=== Eastern Front ===
Woidich was transferred to the 3. Staffel of Jagdgeschwader 52 (JG 52–52nd Fighter Wing) on 1 April 1942. The Staffel was under command of Oberleutnant Helmut Bennemann and subordinated to I. Gruppe of JG 52 led by Hauptmann Karl-Heinz Leesmann. The Gruppe had been withdrawn from combat operations on 1 February 1942, and following a period of recuperation and replenishment at Jesau near Königsberg, present-day Kaliningrad in Russia, had moved to Olmütz, present-day Olomouc in Czech Republic, on 11 April. On 17 May, I. Gruppe was ordered back to the Eastern Front and relocated to Artyomovsk, present-day Bakhmut.

I./JG 52 insignia

Here on the Eastern Front, Woidich claimed seven further aerial victories, taking his total to nine by the end of 1942. For this, he had been awarded both classes of the Iron Cross (Eisernes Kreuz). Following the German defeat at Stalingrad and Soviet advance in Voronezh–Kharkov offensive, I. Gruppe was moved to Anapa located on the northern coast of the Black Sea near the Sea of Azov on 16 May 1943. On 24 May, the Gruppe moved to an airfield at Gostagaevskaya located approximately 20 kilometers (12 miles) northeast Anapa. Here on 11 June, Woidich succeeded Oberleutnant Rudolf Miethig who was killed in action the day before as Staffelkapitän (squadron leader) of 3. Staffel of JG 52. At the time, his score had increased to 16 aerial victories. In preparation for Operation Citadel, I. Gruppe was moved to Bessonovka, a makeshift airfield located approximately 20 kilometers (12 miles) west of Belgorod on 4 July. On 13 July during the Battle of Kursk, Woidich, accompanied by his wingman Leutnant Franz Schall, claimed two Ilyushin Il-2 ground attack aircraft shot down. On 17 October, Woidich was awarded the German Cross in Gold (Deutsches Kreuz in Gold) and by end October was credited with 51 aerial victories. His score of enemy aircraft shot down had increased to 56 by the end of 1943. He had claimed four aircraft shot down on both 7 and 13 July 1943.

On 5 April 1944, I. Gruppe moved to an airfield at Leipzig, present-day Serpneve. Here Woidich claimed his 80th aerial victory on 3 June. For this, Woidich was awarded with the Knight's Cross of the Iron Cross (Ritterkreuz des Eisernen Kreuzes) on 11 June. At the time, behind Leutnant Walter Wolfrum, he was the second most successful active fighter pilot of the Gruppe. A noteworthy achievement was made on 11 January 1944 when he claimed his 57th to 60th aerial victory. He became an "ace-in-a-day" on 17 January 1944 when he shot down his 62nd to 66th enemy aircraft. He again claimed four aircraft shot down on 16 April 1944 for victories 72 to 75. His most successful month was July 1944 with 29 aircraft shot down. On 20 July 1944, Woidich was credited with his 100th aerial victory. He was the 84th Luftwaffe pilot to achieve the century mark. On 10 August, he transferred command of 3. Staffel to Leutnant Leonhard Färber. The Gruppe had reached Grabowiec in eastern Poland on 27 July and Kraków on 1 August. On 12 August they were again relocated and moved to Mzurowa.

=== Flying the Messerschmitt Me 163 ===
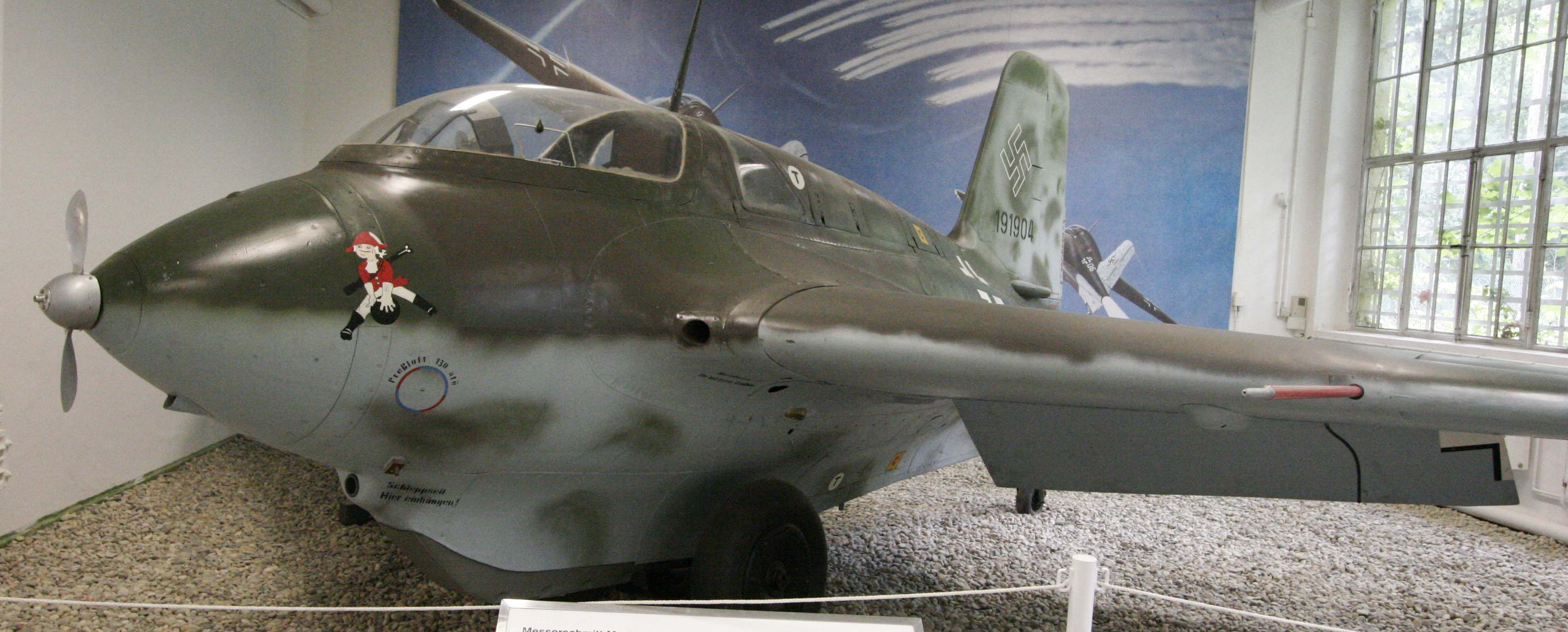
Messerschmitt Me 163 at the Luftwaffenmuseum in Berlin-Gatow

Woidich was transferred to Ergänzungsstaffel (Training/Supplement Squadron) of Jagdgeschwader 400 (JG 400–400th Fighter Wing) for conversion training to the Messerschmitt Me 163 rocket powered aircraft on 11 August 1944. On 12 November, he was appointed the first Staffelkapitän of the 7. Staffel of JG 400. The Staffel was subordinated to II. Gruppe of JG 400 headed by Hauptmann Rudolf Opitz. Alternatively, according to Ransom and Cammann, Woidich was promoted to Oberleutnant (first lieutenant) and appointed commander of 4. Staffel, which on 12 November became 6. Staffel. Ransom and Cammann then state that Woidich transferred command of 4. Staffel to Leutnant Peter Gerth in October 1944. Woidich then succeeded Hauptmann Jochen Langen as Staffelkapitän of 5. Staffel. On 22 April 1945, Woidich claimed one of the very rare aerial victories while flying the Me 163 rocket fighter.

== Later life ==
After World War II in 1953, Ing.-grad. Woidich together with Dipl.-Ing. Karl Thress opened the Ingenieurbüro Woidich (Engineering Office Woidich), an automotive technical engineering bureau, in Mainz-Kastel. (Note: In German, an engineer's degree is called Diplom-Ingenieur, abbreviated Dipl.-Ing. The depreciated graduate engineering degree, Ing.-grad. (graduierter Ingenieur) are no longer awarded.) Woidich's son, Dipl.-Bw. Gerd Woidich, joined the firm in 1981. Woidich died on 27 July 1984 at the age of 83 in Mainz, Germany.

== Summary of career ==
=== Aerial victory claims ===
According to US historian David T. Zabecki, Woidich was credited with 110 aerial victories. Spick also lists him with 110 aerial victories claimed in approximately 1,000 combat missions and a mission-to-claim ratio of 9.09. Mathews and Foreman, authors of Luftwaffe Aces — Biographies and Victory Claims, researched the German Federal Archives and found records for 82 aerial victory claims, plus thirty further unconfirmed claims. This figure of confirmed claims includes 78 aerial victories on the Eastern Front and three on the Western Front, including one four-engined bomber flying the Me 163 rocket fighter.

Victory claims were logged to a map-reference (PQ = Planquadrat), for example "PQ 82191". The Luftwaffe grid map (Jägermeldenetz) covered all of Europe, western Russia and North Africa and was composed of rectangles measuring 15 minutes of latitude by 30 minutes of longitude, an area of about 360 square miles (930 km^{2}). These sectors were then subdivided into 36 smaller units to give a location area 3 km × 4 km (1.9 mi × 2.5 mi) in size.

Chronicle of aerial victories
This and the ♠ (Ace of spades) indicates those aerial victories which made Woidich an "ace-in-a-day", a term which designates a fighter pilot who has shot down five or more airplanes in a single day. This and the – (dash) indicates unconfirmed aerial victory claims for which Woidich did not receive credit. This and the ? (question mark) indicates information discrepancies listed by Prien, Stemmer, Rodeike, Bock, Mathews and Foreman.
Claim	Date	Time	Type	Location	Claim	Date	Time	Type	Location
– 5. Staffel of Jagdgeschwader 27 – North Africa — 22 September 1941 – 6 December 1942
—	21 November 1941	15:00	P-40	7 km (4.3 mi) south of Ain el Gazala	—	12 February 1942	—	P-40	15 km (9.3 mi) southwest of Fort Acroma
1	22 November 1941	16:35	P-40	northwest of Bir Hakeim	2	15 March 1942	11:25	P-40	20 km (12 mi) southeast of Ain el Gazala
– 3. Staffel of Jagdgeschwader 52 – Eastern Front — 19 May 1942 – 3 February 1943
3	10 July 1942	10:12	MiG-1	1 km (0.62 mi) southeast of Putilin	8	3 September 1942	14:30	Il-2	2 km (1.2 mi) north of Djatlicka
4	23 August 1942	13:10	LaGG-3	3 km (1.9 mi) east of Kirejewskoje	9	28 October 1942	15:05	Yak-1	6 km (3.7 mi) northwest of Akhtuba
5	2 September 1942	05:36	Pe-2	5 km (3.1 mi) northeast of Kopetowka	10	29 January 1943	07:06	Il-2	PQ 82191, 1 km (0.62 mi) west of Archangelskoje
6	2 September 1942	16:42	LaGG-3	1 km (0.62 mi) north of Garetewo	11	1 February 1943	08:06	R-5	PQ 72 654, 2 km (1.2 mi) northeast of Kolpna
7	3 September 1942	14:20	Pe-2	5 km (3.1 mi) northeast of Sokolowo					
– 3. Staffel of Jagdgeschwader 52 – Eastern Front — 4 February – 31 December 1943
12	29 March 1943	09:02	La-5	PQ 35 Ost 61873, 1 km (0.62 mi) south of Nepokrytoje	35	5 August 1943	18:20	Pe-2	PQ 35 Ost 61641, north of Pogarrowskij
13	16 April 1943	10:52	LaGG-3	PQ 34 Ost 85742 southeast of Krymsk	36	15 August 1943	07:30	La-5	PQ 35 Ost 60158, 6 km (3.7 mi) south of Bezliudivka
14	18 April 1943	16:21	Il-2	PQ 34 Ost 75452; 8 km (5.0 mi) south of Novorossiysk	37	21 August 1943	16:55	Yak-1	PQ 34 Ost 88228, 9 km (5.6 mi) south of Pervomaisk
15	27 April 1943	17:15	Yak-1	PQ 34 Ost 85114, 10 km (6.2 mi) east of Krymskaya vicinity of Mertschanskaja	38	22 August 1943	09:55	La-5	PQ 35 Ost 70789, west Dolynska
16	6 May 1943	13:15	La-5	PQ 35 Ost 61272, 25 km (16 mi) north of Belgorod	39	22 August 1943	10:01	La-5	PQ 35 Ost 70797, 1 km (0.62 mi) east Dolynska
17	5 July 1943	07:58	La-5	PQ 35 Ost 61192, 5 km (3.1 mi) northeast of Kowowino	40	24 August 1943	13:58	Il-2	PQ 34 Ost 79123, 2 km (1.2 mi) southwest Dolynska
18	5 July 1943	15:25	Il-2 m.H. (Note: The "m.H." refers to an Ilyushin Il-2 with rear gunner (mit Heckschütze).)	PQ 35 Ost 61481, vicinity of Belgorod; 1 km (0.62 mi) wesr of Helewoje	41	20 September 1943	15:50	Yak	PQ 34 Ost 76884, 12 km (7.5 mi) east of Gostagejewskaja; 1 km (0.62 mi) east of Dolynska
19	7 July 1943	03:38	Il-2	PQ 35 Ost 61642, 1 km (0.62 mi) east of Rshewez	42	22 September 1943	07:08	Pe-2	PQ 34 Ost 66663, 9 km (5.6 mi) southwest of Fontalowskaja
20	7 July 1943	14:50	Il-2 m.H.	PQ 35 Ost 61463, 2 km (1.2 mi) northeast of Schechtelkino; 25 km (16 mi) east of Belgorod	43	27 September 1943	05:50	Boston	PQ 34 Ost 76534, 4 km (2.5 mi) southwest of Starotitarovskaya
21	7 July 1943	17:30	Yak-1	PQ 35 Ost 61243, 3 km (1.9 mi) southwest of Luchki	44	22 October 1943	05:45	Yak-9	PQ 34 Ost 58564, south of Kalinowka
22	8 July 1943	03:48	Il-2	PQ 35 Ost 61484, 25 km (16 mi) east of Belgorod; 15 km (9.3 mi) southeast of Belgorod	45	23 October 1943	07:20	Yak-1	PQ 34 Ost 58671, 1 km (0.62 mi) east of Nowo-Nuntal
23	12 July 1943	14:50	Il-2	PQ 35 Ost 62796, 3 km (1.9 mi) west of Kotschetowka	46	23 October 1943	07:20	Yak-1	PQ 34 Ost 58671, 3 km (1.9 mi) northwest of Jantschebrak
24	13 July 1943	08:56	Il-2 m.H.	PQ 35 Ost 61413, 4 km (2.5 mi) west of Schepino	47	23 October 1943	07:28	Il-2 m.H.	PQ 34 Ost 58533, 4 km (2.5 mi) east of Vasilyevka
25	13 July 1943	08:58	Il-2 m.H.	PQ 35 Ost 61432, 1 km (0.62 mi) east of Grenijatschet	48	24 October 1943	06:55	La-5	PQ 34 Ost 59751, 2 km (1.2 mi) south of Grossa
26	13 July 1943	13:59	Il-2 m.H.	PQ 35 Ost 61433, 1 km (0.62 mi) west of Schekino	49	24 October 1943	13:51	Il-2 m.H.	PQ 34 Ost 57173, 4 km (2.5 mi) north of Nowo-Nikolajewka
27	13 July 1943	14:01	Il-2 m.H.	PQ 35 Ost 61227, 3 km (1.9 mi) northwest of Winogredowka	50	27 October 1943	10:32	Il-2 m.H.	PQ 34 Ost 57362, 3 km (1.9 mi) northeast of Girsowka
28	15 July 1943	12:36	Il-4	PQ 35 Ost 61225, 1 km (0.62 mi) north of Winogredowka	51	27 October 1943	10:33	Il-2 m.H.	PQ 34 Ost 57381, 2 km (1.2 mi) south of Ternowka
29	18 July 1943	06:51	Il-2	PQ 34 Ost 88432, 3 km (1.9 mi) east of Marienheim (Perekrestovo)	52	6 November 1943	10:55	Yak-1	PQ 34 Ost 46114, 1 km (0.62 mi) east of Tomaschewka
30	26 July 1943	18:10	Yak-1	PQ 34 Ost 88283, 1 km (0.62 mi) south of Jalizwechino	53	28 November 1943	09:30	P-39	PQ 34 Ost 29491, 2 km (1.2 mi) west of Nowaja Praga
31	31 July 1943	16:57	Il-2	PQ 34 Ost 88263, 10 km (6.2 mi) east of Marinowka	54	29 November 1943	14:28	P-39	PQ 34 Ost 39173, 3 km (1.9 mi) south of Kossowka
32	1 August 1943	10:32	Il-2	PQ 34 Ost 88258, 1 km (0.62 mi) north of Kalinowka	55	15 December 1943	10:30	Yak-9	25 km (16 mi) northwest of Nowgorodka
33	1 August 1943	10:35	Il-2	PQ 34 Ost 88253, 1 km (0.62 mi) south of Stepanowka	56	17 December 1943	12:27	P-39	north of Nowgorodka; 3 km (1.9 mi) north of Nowgorodka
34	4 August 1943	14:10	La-5	PQ 34 Ost 61683, 1 km (0.62 mi) north of Starja Stavolz					
– 3. Staffel of Jagdgeschwader 52 – Eastern Front — January – July 1944
57	11 January 1944	08:25	P-39	PQ 34 Ost 29379, 7 km (4.3 mi) west of Kirovograd	84? (Note: According to Mathews and Foreman this claim is unconfirmed.)	17 July 1944	—	La-5	
58	11 January 1944	15:05	Yak-9	PQ 34 Ost 29533, 6 km (3.7 mi) southeast of Kirovograd	85?	17 July 1944	—	La-5	
59	11 January 1944	15:05	Yak-9	PQ 34 Ost 29533, 6 km (3.7 mi) southeast of Kirovograd	86?	17 July 1944	—	La-5	
60	11 January 1944	15:06	Yak-9	PQ 34 Ost 29522, 3 km (1.9 mi) southwest of Kirovograd	87?	18 July 1944	—	Yak-9	
61	12 January 1944	14:35	Il-2 m.H.	PQ 34 Ost 29512, 3 km (1.9 mi) southeast of Gruškovje	88?	18 July 1944	—	Yak-9	
62♠	17 January 1944	14:35	Il-2 m.H.	PQ 34 Ost 29512, 4 km (2.5 mi) southeast of Gruškovje	89?	18 July 1944	—	P-39	
63♠	17 January 1944	14:50	R-5	PQ 34 Ost 29183, 2 km (1.2 mi) south of Fedwa	90?	18 July 1944	—	P-39	
64♠	17 January 1944	14:51	R-5	PQ 34 Ost 29322, 4 km (2.5 mi) south of Fedwa	91?	18 July 1944	—	Il-2	
65♠	17 January 1944	14:52	R-5	PQ 34 Ost 29322, 5 km (3.1 mi) south of Fedwa	92?	18 July 1944	—	P-39	
66♠	17 January 1944	14:53	R-5	PQ 34 Ost 29331, 6 km (3.7 mi) south of Fedwa	93?	19 July 1944	—	Il-2	
67	28 March 1944	16:42	Il-2	PQ 24 Ost 98181, 3 km (1.9 mi) west of Domniza	94?	19 July 1944	—	Il-2	
68	30 March 1944	17:00	P-39	PQ 24 Ost 78634, 5 km (3.1 mi) north of Tesanrani	95?	19 July 1944	—	Yak-9	
69	30 March 1944	17:00? (Note: According to Mathews and Foreman claimed at 17:01.)	P-39	PQ 24 Ost 78632, 1 km (0.62 mi) east of Slobozia	96?	19 July 1944	—	Yak-9	
70	14 April 1944	11:40	R-5	PQ 24 Ost 78622, 3 km (1.9 mi) north of Soltozia	97?	19 July 1944	—	P-39	
71	14 April 1944	11:41	R-5	PQ 24 Ost 78484, east of Fălești east of Fălești railroad	98?	19 July 1944	—	P-39	
72	16 April 1944	11:10	B-25	PQ 24 Ost 78524, 4 km (2.5 mi) south of Hallemi vicinity of Hallemi	99?	20 July 1944	—	P-39	
73	16 April 1944	12:40	P-39	PQ 24 Ost 78584, 5 km (3.1 mi) east of Românești	100?	20 July 1944	—	P-39	
74	16 April 1944	12:41	Il-2 m.H.	PQ 24 Ost 78632, 2 km (1.2 mi) north of Gropmitz	101?	20 July 1944	—	La-5	
75	16 April 1944	12:42	Il-2 m.H.	PQ 24 Ost 78552, 4 km (2.5 mi) north of Singeri	102?	20 July 1944	—	La-5	
76	3 May 1944	09:24	P-39	10 km (6.2 mi) southwest of Targul Frumos	103?	21 July 1944	—	Il-2	
77	11 May 1944	11:17	P-39	PQ 24 Ost 98723, 7 km (4.3 mi) northwest of Grigoriopol	104?	21 July 1944	—	Il-2	
78	11 May 1944	11:21	Pe-2	6 km (3.7 mi) south of Tiraspol	105?	22 July 1944	—	Yak-9	
79	15 May 1944	13:16	La-5	PQ 24 Ost 98723, 7 km (4.3 mi) northwest of Grigoriopol	106?	22 July 1944	—	Yak-9	
80	3 June 1944	10:20	La-5	PQ 24 Ost 78674, 8 km (5.0 mi) north of Iași	107?	22 July 1944	—	Yak-9	
81	16 July 1944	16:00? (Note: According to Mathews and Foreman claimed at 16:05.)	Il-2 m.H.	PQ 25 Ost 41822, 9 km (5.6 mi) south of Slotschuw vicinity of Zolochiv	108?	24 July 1944	—	La-5	
82?	17 July 1944	—	P-39		109?	24 July 1944	—	La-5	
83?	17 July 1944	—	P-39						
– 6. Staffel of Jagdgeschwader 400 – Defense of the Reich — 1945
110	22 April 1945	—	four-engined bomber						

=== Awards ===
- Iron Cross (1939) 2nd and 1st Class
- Honor Goblet of the Luftwaffe on 13 September 1943 as Oberfeldwebel and pilot
- German Cross in Gold on 17 October 1943 as Oberfeldwebel in the 3./Jagdgeschwader 52
- Knight's Cross of the Iron Cross on 11 June 1944 as pilot and Leutnant of the Reserves in the 3./Jagdgeschwader 52 (Note: According to Scherzer as Leutnant.)
