= Lipa, Jędrzejów County =

Lipa
- Village
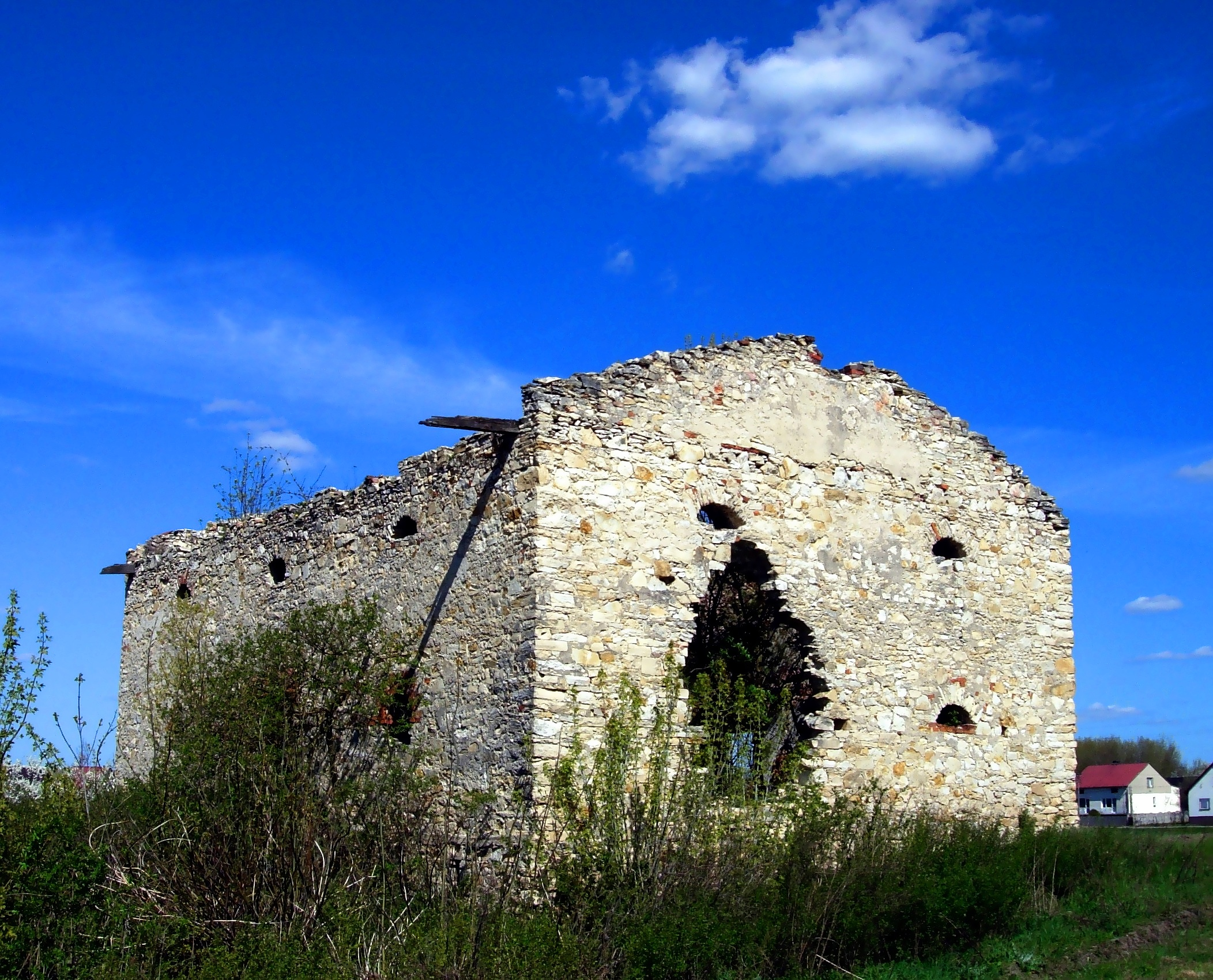
- Granary

- Location within Poland
- Coordinates: 50°39′53″N 20°33′38″E
- Country: Poland
- Voivodeship: Świętokrzyskie
- County: Jędrzejów
- Gmina: Sobków

Lipa [ˈlipa] is a village in the administrative district of Gmina Sobków, within Jędrzejów County, Świętokrzyskie Voivodeship, in south-central Poland. It lies approximately 9 km (6 mi) south-east of Sobków, 19 km (12 mi) east of Jędrzejów, and 25 km (16 mi) south of the regional capital Kielce.
