= Karsy, Jędrzejów County =

Karsy
- Village
- Location within Poland
- Coordinates: 50°39′19″N 20°33′2″E
- Country: Poland
- Voivodeship: Świętokrzyskie
- County: Jędrzejów
- Gmina: Sobków

Karsy [ˈkarsɨ] is a village in the administrative district of Gmina Sobków, within Jędrzejów County, Świętokrzyskie Voivodeship, in south-central Poland. It lies approximately 9 km (6 mi) south-east of Sobków, 18 km (11 mi) east of Jędrzejów, and 26 km (16 mi) south of the regional capital Kielce.
