= Gajówka, Świętokrzyskie Voivodeship =

Gajówka
- Village
- Location within Poland
- Coordinates: 50°43′17″N 20°30′39″E
- Country: Poland
- Voivodeship: Świętokrzyskie
- County: Jędrzejów
- Gmina: Sobków

Gajówka [ɡajuvka] is a village in the administrative district of Gmina Sobków, within Jędrzejów County, Świętokrzyskie Voivodeship, in south-central Poland.
