= Jawór =

- Village
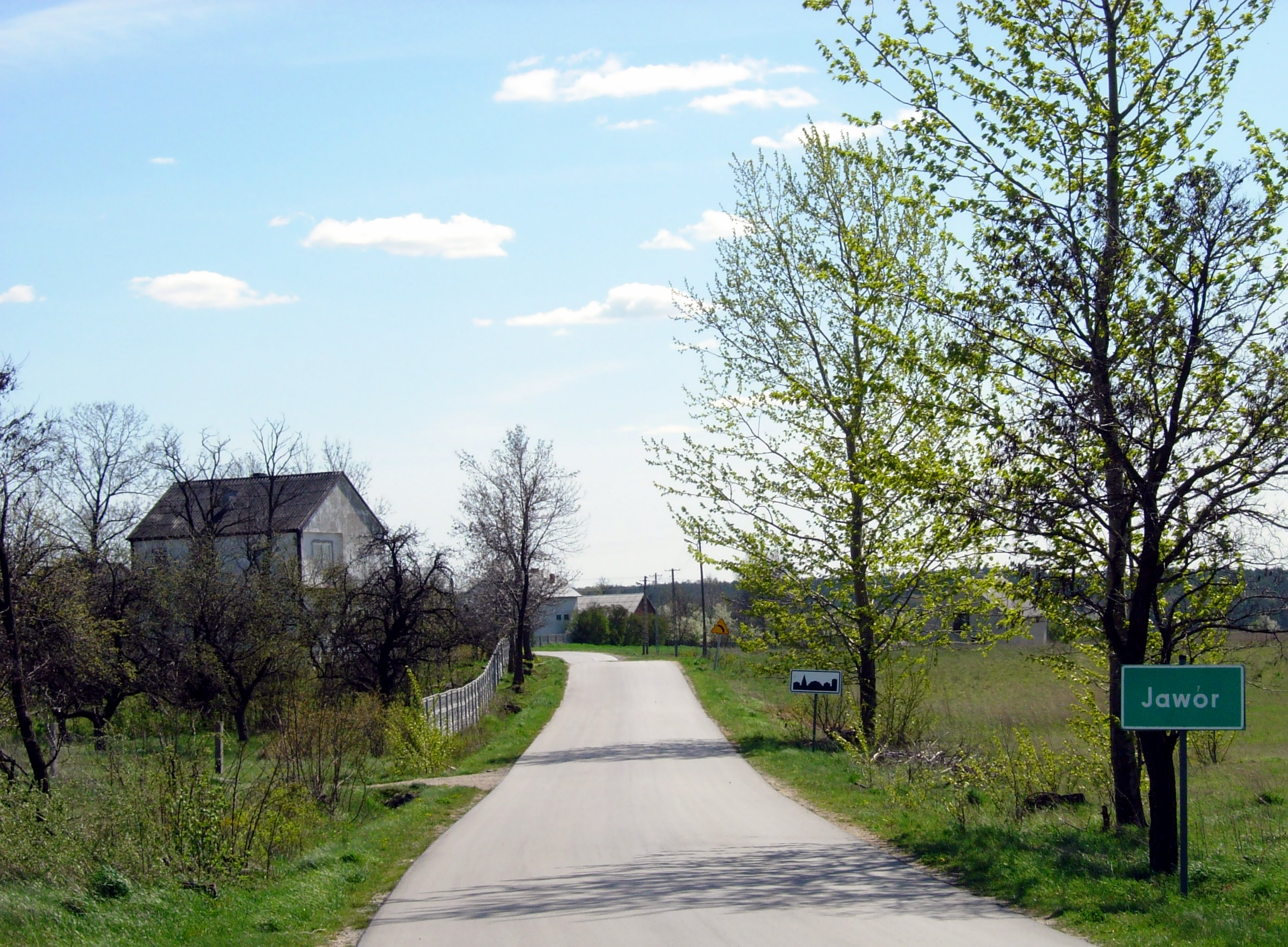

- Location within Poland
- Coordinates: 50°40′15″N 20°32′40″E
- Country: Poland
- Voivodeship: Świętokrzyskie
- County: Jędrzejów
- Gmina: Sobków

Jawór [ˈjavur] is a village in the administrative district of Gmina Sobków, within Jędrzejów County, Świętokrzyskie Voivodeship, in south-central Poland. It lies approximately 8 km (5 mi) south-east of Sobków, 18 km (11 mi) east of Jędrzejów, and 25 km (16 mi) south of the regional capital Kielce.
