= Wierzbica, Jędrzejów County =

Wierzbica
- Village
- Location within Poland
- Coordinates: 50°42′17″N 20°29′43″E
- Country: Poland
- Voivodeship: Świętokrzyskie
- County: Jędrzejów
- Gmina: Sobków
- Population: 220

Wierzbica [vjɛʐˈbit͡sa] is a village in the administrative district of Gmina Sobków, within Jędrzejów County, Świętokrzyskie Voivodeship, in south-central Poland. It lies approximately 4 km (2 mi) east of Sobków, 16 km (10 mi) north-east of Jędrzejów, and 22 km (14 mi) south-west of the regional capital Kielce.
