= Kazimierz Braun =

Polish director, writer, and scholar

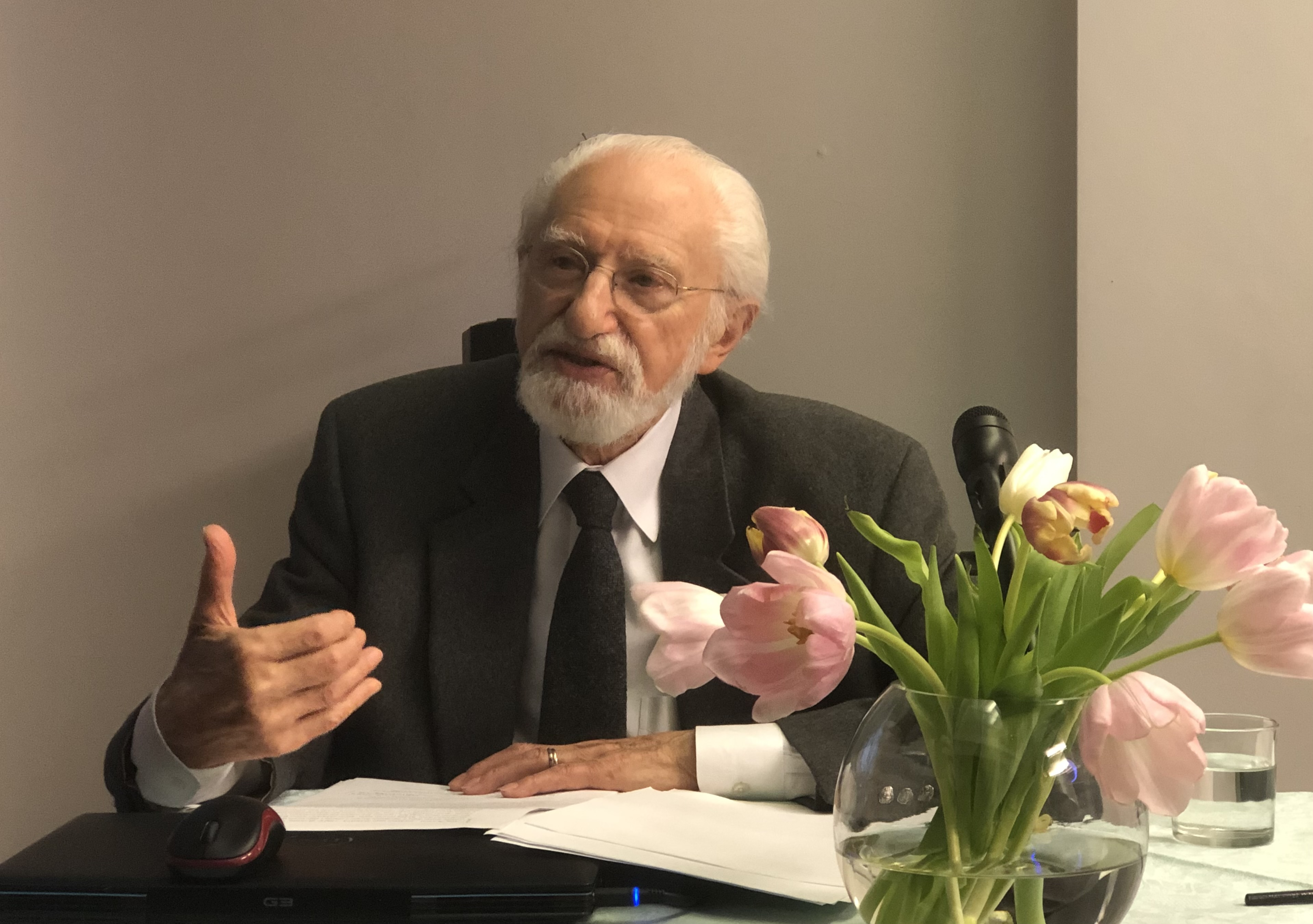
- Kazimierz Braun in 2024
- Born: June 29, 1936 (age 90); Mokrsko Dolne, Poland
- Children: 3, including Grzegorz Braun

Academic background
- Education: Adam Mickiewicz University in Poznań (MA, PhD); Aleksander Zelwerowicz National Academy of Dramatic Art in Warsaw (MFA; habilitation in directing, 1988); University of Wrocław (habilitation in theatre studies, 1975)

Academic work
- Discipline: Theatre
- Institutions: University at Buffalo; University of Wrocław; New York University; Swarthmore College; University of California, Santa Cruz; Teatr im. Juliusza Osterwy, Lublin; Teatr Współczesny, Wrocław

Kazimierz Braun (born June 29, 1936) is a Polish director, writer, and scholar.

== Education ==
Braun was born in Mokrsko Dolne. He earned a master's degree in Polish literature from Adam Mickiewicz University in Poznań in 1958 and a master's degree in directing from the Aleksander Zelwerowicz National Academy of Dramatic Art in Warsaw in 1962. He earned a Ph.D. from Adam Mickiewicz University in 1971. He completed a habilitation in theatre studies at the University of Wrocław in 1975 and a habilitation in directing at the Warsaw theatre academy in 1988.

== Career ==
Braun became a tenured professor at the University at Buffalo in 1989. In 1992, he received the title of Professor of Humanities from the President of Poland, based on a 1984 resolution of the University of Wrocław that had been delayed during the Communist period.

He made his debut as a professional theatre director in 1961, and as a professional television director in 1962. He has directed works at the Polish Theatre in Warsaw, Teatr Wybrzeże in Gdańsk, the Juliusz Słowacki Theatre in Kraków, and Teatr Solskiego in Tarnów, as well as in Canada, Germany, Ireland, and the United States. He was artistic director of Teatr im. Juliusza Osterwy, Lublin from 1967 to 1971, and general and artistic director there from 1971 to 1974. From 1975 to 1984, he was general and artistic director of Teatr Współczesny, Wrocław. He was removed from the Wrocław position in 1984 during the Communist period; Encyklopedia Teatru Polskiego identifies his 1983 adaptation of Albert Camus's The Plague as the immediate cause of the authorities' decision.

Since 1985, Braun has lived and worked in the United States, where he has directed productions at professional theatres including the Guthrie Theatre in Minneapolis and the Odyssey Theatre in Los Angeles, while also teaching and directing at several universities. His best-known directorial works include plays by Cyprian Norwid (15 theatre and television productions), Tadeusz Różewicz (19 shows), William Shakespeare (12 shows in Polish and English), and Adam Mickiewicz (two shows). He has taught at the University of Wrocław, New York University, Swarthmore College, the University of California, Santa Cruz, and the University at Buffalo.

Braun has translated works from English, French, and Italian into Polish, and from Polish, French, and Russian into English.

== Personal life ==
Braun's father, Juliusz Braun, was a lawyer, professor of ecology, Catholic activist, and political prisoner under Joseph Stalin. His mother was Elżbieta Korwin-Szymanowska. They both died in 1990.

Braun is married to Zofia Reklewska-Braun, a writer and theatre historian. They have three children (Dr. Monika Braun, a writer and academic; Grzegorz Braun, a politician; and Dr. Justyna Braun, an academic) and eight grandchildren (Anna, Joanna, Aniela, Zofia, Elżbieta, Aleksander, Helena, and Jerzy).

== Credits ==
Between 1961 and 2016 Braun directed 155 theatre productions in Poland, the United States, Canada, the Republic of Ireland, Germany and other countries, including:

- 1961: Karol / On the Sea / Strip-tease (Sławomir Mrożek), Gdańsk
- 1962: The Ring of a Great Lady (Cyprian Norwid), Warsaw
- 1962: Two Theatres (Jerzy Szaniawski), Warsaw
- 1963: The Caucasian Chalk Circle (Bertolt Brecht), Gdańsk
- 1963: Romeo and Juliet (William Shakespeare), Warsaw
- 1965: The Wedding (Stanisław Wyspiański), Toruń
- 1967: November's Night (Wyspiański), Gdańsk
- 1968: Hamlet (Shakespeare), Lublin
- 1968: Kleopatra and Cezar (Norwid), Lublin
- 1970: Interrupted Act (Tadeusz Różewicz), Lublin
- 1970: Behind the Wings (Norwid), Kraków
- 1971: The Ashes (Stefan Żeromski), director's adaptation, Television Theatre
- 1972: The Deliverance (Wyspiański), Lublin
- 1973: The Old Woman (Różewicz), Lublin
- 1977: Operetta (Witold Gombrowicz), Wrocław
- 1978: The Forefathers' Eve (Adam Mickiewicz), Wrocław
- 1979: Birth Rate (Różewicz), director's adaptation, Wrocław
- 1982: The Forefathers' Eve (Mickiewicz), director's adaptation, Wrocław
- 1982: Twelfth Night (Shakespeare), Wrocław
- 1983: The Plague (Albert Camus), director's adaptation, Wrocław
- 1984: The Trap (Różewicz), Wrocław
- 1986: Rhinoceros (Eugène Ionesco), Minneapolis
- 1987: The Hunger Artist (Różewicz), Buffalo
- 1988: The Shoemakers (Witkacy), Los Angeles
- 1989: King Lear (Shakespeare), Buffalo
- 1990: Immigrant Queen (Braun), Toronto
- 1991: As You Like It (Shakespeare), Buffalo
- 1995: Tango (Sławomir Mrożek), Knoxville, Tennessee
- 1996: A Man for All Seasons (Robert Bolt), Buffalo
- 1999: Richard III (Shakespeare), Buffalo
- 2003: Europe (Jerzy Braun), Tarnów
- 2004: Paderewski's Children (Braun), Buffalo
- 2006: The Fall of a Stone House (Brandstaetter), Tarnów
- 2006: Card Index Scattered (Różewicz), Buffalo
- 2008: The Tales of Pola Negri (Braun), Toronto
- 2010: The Book of Christopher Columbus (Paul Claudel), Steubenville, Ohio
- 2011: Father Maximilian's Cell (Braun), Tarnów
- 2012: Ordonka's Mysteries (Braun), Toronto
- 2012: The Power and the Glory (Graham Greene), director's adaptation, Buffalo
- 2014: The Tempest (Shakespeare), Buffalo
- 2016: Norwid Returs (Braun), Tarnów

== Scholarly books (selection) ==
- 1967: Teofil Trzciński (with Zofia Reklewska-Braun), PIW, Warsaw
- 1971: Cyprian Norwid's Theatre Without Theatre, PIW, Warsaw
- 1972: Theatre of Communion, Wyd. Literackie, Kraków
- 1975: New Theatre in the World, WaiF, Warsaw
- 1979: The Second Reform of Theatre, Ossolineum, Wrocław
- 1982: Theatre Space, PWN, Warsaw
- 1984: The Great Reform of Theatre, Ossolineum, Wrocław
- 1994: Polish Theatre 1939-1989, Semper, Warsaw
- 1996: A History of Polish Theatre 1939-1989, Greenwood Press, Westport, Connecticut
- 2000: Theatre Directing, Mellen Press, Lewiston, New York
- 2003: A Concise History of Polish Theatre, Mellen Press, Lewiston
- 2005: A Concise History of American Theatre, Wyd. UAM, Poznań
- 2010: Lady Designer, Jadwiga Pożakowska, Muzeum Narodowe, Gdańsk
- 2011: Brothers Adamowicz (with Zofia Reklewska-Braun), Wyd. Uniw. Rzeszowskiego
- 2013: My Różewicz's Theatre, Wyd. Uniw. Rzeszowskiego
- 2014: My Norwid's Theatre, Wyd. Uniw. Rzeszowskiego
- 2015: Direccion teatral: Arte, etica, creatividad, Universitado Nat. Aut., Mexico
- 2019: The Bright Light of Gietrzwałd (with Zofia Reklewska-Braun), Wyd. Osuchowa
- 2019: The Great Reform of Theater (with Justyna Braun), Mellen Press, Lewiston
- 2020: Theatricality of Life, Wyd. A. Marszałek
- 2022: The Second Reform of Theatre (expanded edition), Wyd. Volumen
- 2023: Cyprian Norwid on Frederyk Chopin and His Music, (translations and essays), Literary Waves, London
- 2024: What Happened to 21st-Century Theatre?, Wydawnictwo Adam Marszałek, Toruń

== Novels, plays, poetry and translations (selection) ==
- 1989: The Monument, Instytut Literacki, Paris
- 1993: Helena: The Story of Modjeska, High Park Press, Toronto
- 1996: Farewell to Alaska, PAX, Warszawa
- 1996: The Story of Norwid: A One-Man Drama, Bernardinum, Pelplin
- 1999: Day of Witness, Wyd. 4K, Bytom
- 2003: A Bird on Stilts: Short Stories, Wyd. A. Marszałek, Toruń
- 2005: Day of Witness (expanded edition), Wyd. Św. Wojciecha, Poznań
- 2006: Radiation, Archiwum Emigracji, Toruń
- 2008: Ten Days in People's Poland, Norbertinum, Lublin
- 2011: Maximilianus, Wyd. Bratni Zew, Kraków
- 2011: Tarnów's Wind of Freedom, Wyd. Biblioteka Publiczna, Tarnów
- 2013: Good Priests (with Zofia Reklewska-Braun), Bernardinum, Pelplin
- 2016: The Alarm Bell, Volumen, Warszawa
- 2018: A Rehearsal of the Apocalypse, Wyd. A. Marszałek, Toruń
- 2021: Paderewski's Children. Paderewski Returns (a bilingual edition), Inst. Dziedzictwa I Myśli Narodowej, Warszawa
- 2022: Zagłada, Wydawnictwo Capital, Warsaw
- 2022: Dramas 2022, Wyd. A. Marszałek, Toruń
- 2022: Anticipation. Poetry, 3DOM, Częstochowa
- 2023: The Pyramid. Memoirs, Volumen, Warszawa
- 2024: Zagłada 2.0, Wydawnictwo Capital, Warsaw
- 2024: Zagłada 3.0, Wydawnictwo Capital, Warsaw
- 2024: Cyprian Norwid: Poems and Poetic Fragments, translated by Kazimierz Braun, Literary Waves Publishing, London
- 2024: Cyprian Norwid: The Actor, introduction, edition and translation by Kazimierz Braun, Literary Waves Publishing, London
- 2024: Collected Plays, Volume 1: Plays for One Actor, bilingual Polish-English edition, Moonrise Press, Los Angeles
- 2024: Collected Plays, Volume 2: Theater of Discord, bilingual Polish-English edition, Moonrise Press, Los Angeles
- 2025: Collected Plays, Volume 3: Theater of Woman Artists, bilingual Polish-English edition, Moonrise Press, Los Angeles
- 2025: Collected Plays, Volume 4: Theater of Memory, bilingual Polish-English edition, Moonrise Press, Los Angeles
- 2025: Avventura in Sardinia, Wydawnictwo Adam Marszałek, Toruń
- 2025: Three Paderewski Plays, Moonrise Press, Los Angeles
- 2026: You Have Spoken, Lord…, Arcana Publishing, Kraków
- 2026: Lord Conrad: The Story of Józef Korzeniowski, Literary Waves Publishing, London

Additionally, books-interviews:

- 1989: The Languages of Theatre, with Tadeusz Różewicz, Wydawnictwo Dolnośląskie, Wrocław
- 1993: A Torn Curtain, conversation with Stanisław Bereś, Aneks Publishing House, London

In total, between 1967 and 2026, Kazimierz Braun published 95 books.

== Awards and honors ==
- 1963: Best Director, Caucasian Chock Circle (Brecht), Toruń Theatre Festival
- 1964: Best Director, Enchanted Circle (Rydel), Television Theatre Festival
- 1965: Best Director, Actor (Norwid), Television Theatre Festival and Kalisz Theatre Festival
- 1966: Best Director, The Wedding (Wyspiański), Toruń Theatre Festival
- 1970: Best Director, Interrupted Act (Różewicz), Kalisz Theatre Festival
- 1971: Medal for Merit to Culture, Poland
- 1976: Medal for Educational Theatre, Poland
- 1978: Gold Cross of Merit, Poland
- 1979: Award for the Mise-en-Scène, Operetta (Gombrowicz), International Theatre Festival, Sitges, Spain
- 1980: Golden Fredro Award for Director, Birth Rate (Różewicz), Wrocław
- 1980: Japanese Foundation Award
- 1984: Golden Fredro Award for Director, The Plague (Camus), Wrocław
- 1985: Independent Culture Award, Poland
- 1990: Guggenheim Foundation Award, United States
- 1996: Director, Best Production in Buffalo, A Man for All Seasons (Bolt)
- 1997: Chivalry Cross of the Polish Order of Merit
- 2001: Aurum Literary Award, Toronto
- 2001: Fulbright Program, United States
- 2003: Turzański Foundation Award, Canada
- 2004: Minister of Education Award, Poland
- 2005: Polish-American Congress Annual Award
- 2005: Medal for Merit to Culture, Poland
- 2005: Officer's Cross of the Polish Order of Merit
- 2007: Medal for Merit to Culture, Poland
- 2011: Golden Owl Award, Austria
- 2011: Commander's Cross of the Polish Order of Merit
- 2016 Commander's Cross of the Order Polonia Restituta
- 2021: Norwid Foundation Medal, Poland
- 2023: London Prize for Literature, awarded by the Union of Polish Writers Abroad
- 2025: Golden Award from the Helena Modjeska Art and Culture Club in Los Angeles
