= Choiny =

Choiny may refer to the following places in Poland:

- Choiny, Lublin Voivodeship (east Poland)
- Choiny, Świętokrzyskie Voivodeship (south-central Poland)
- Choiny, Garwolin County in Masovian Voivodeship (east-central Poland)
- Choiny, Mińsk County in Masovian Voivodeship
- Choiny, Gmina Wąsewo, Ostrów County in Masovian Voivodeship
- Choiny, Wołomin County in Masovian Voivodeship
