= Niziny =

Niziny may refer to the following places in Poland:

- Niziny, Lower Silesian Voivodeship (south-west Poland)
- Niziny, Busko County in Świętokrzyskie Voivodeship (south-central Poland)
- Niziny, Jędrzejów County in Świętokrzyskie Voivodeship (south-central Poland)
