= Wólka Kawęcka =

- Village
- Location within Poland
- Coordinates: 50°41′49″N 20°25′13″E
- Country: Poland
- Voivodeship: Świętokrzyskie
- County: Jędrzejów
- Gmina: Sobków

Wólka Kawęcka [ˈvulka kaˈvɛnt͡ska] is a village in the administrative district of Gmina Sobków, within Jędrzejów County, Świętokrzyskie Voivodeship, in south-central Poland. It lies approximately 3 km (2 mi) west of Sobków, 12 km (7 mi) north-east of Jędrzejów, and 25 km (16 mi) south-west of the regional capital Kielce.
