= Staniowice =

- Village
- Location within Poland
- Coordinates: 50°41′9″N 20°29′13″E
- Country: Poland
- Voivodeship: Świętokrzyskie
- County: Jędrzejów
- Gmina: Sobków
- Website: staniowice.pl

Staniowice [staɲɔˈvit͡sɛ] is a village in the administrative district of Gmina Sobków, within Jędrzejów County, Świętokrzyskie Voivodeship, in south-central Poland. It lies approximately 3 km (2 mi) south-east of Sobków, 15 km (9 mi) north-east of Jędrzejów, and 24 km (15 mi) south-west of the regional capital Kielce.
