= Korytnica, Jędrzejów County =

Korytnica
- Village
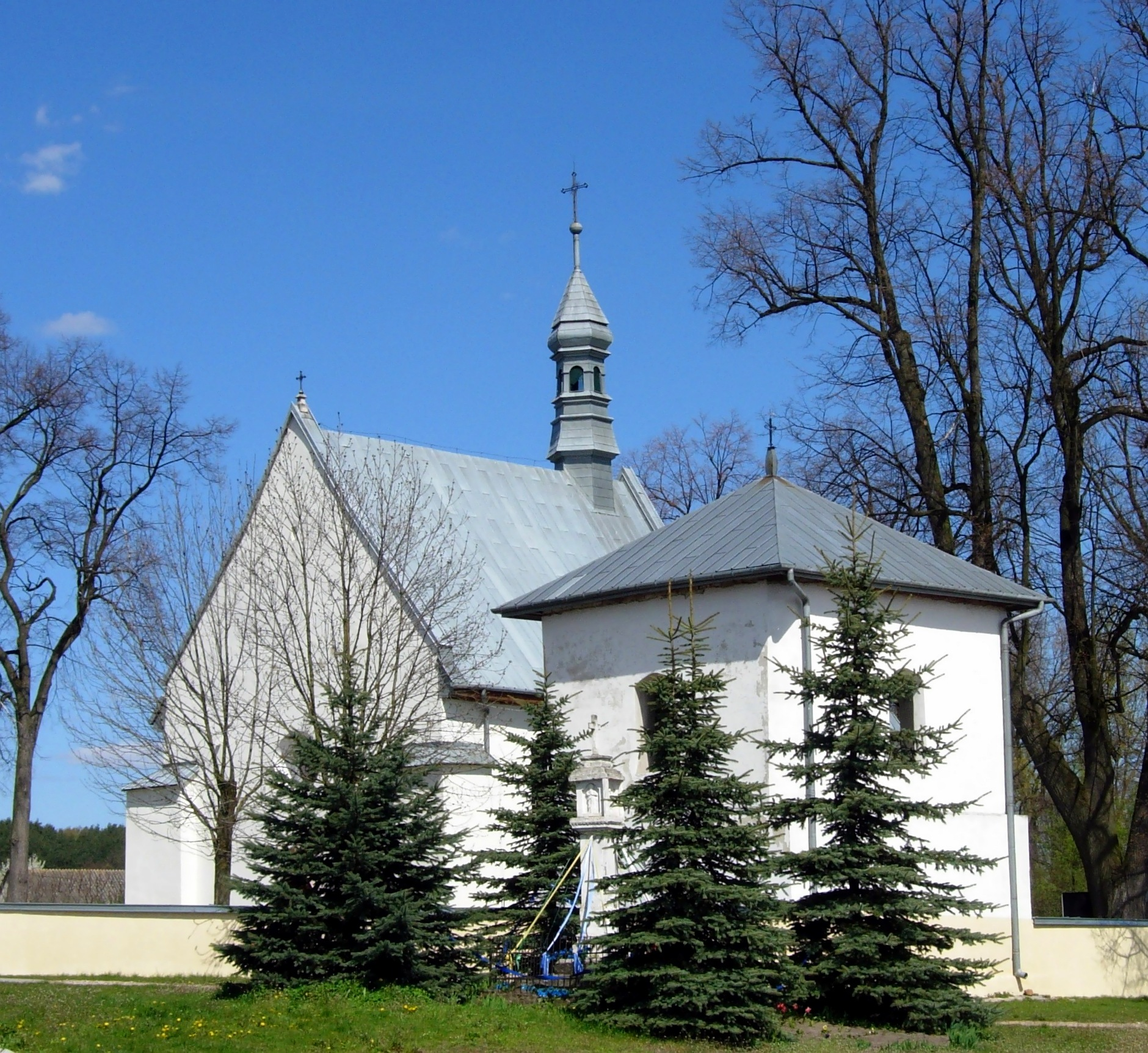
- Catholic church

- Location within Poland
- Coordinates: 50°39′25″N 20°31′0″E
- Country: Poland
- Voivodeship: Świętokrzyskie
- County: Jędrzejów
- Gmina: Sobków
- Population: 860

Korytnica [kɔrɨtˈnit͡sa] is a village in the administrative district of Gmina Sobków, within Jędrzejów County, Świętokrzyskie Voivodeship, in south-central Poland. It lies approximately 7 km (4 mi) south-east of Sobków, 16 km (10 mi) east of Jędrzejów, and 27 km (17 mi) south of the regional capital Kielce.

The village is famous for a palaeontological locality situated nearby. It yielded several Miocene species, above all gastropods. Some of these fossil animals were named after the village, like for example the bryozoan Stephanollona korytnicensis.
