= Sobków-Nida =

- Village
- Location within Poland
- Coordinates: 50°42′16″N 20°26′49″E
- Country: Poland
- Voivodeship: Świętokrzyskie
- County: Jędrzejów
- Gmina: Sobków

Sobków-Nida [ˈsɔbkufˈnida] is a colony in the administrative district of Gmina Sobków, within Jędrzejów County, Świętokrzyskie Voivodeship, in south-central Poland.
