= Kazimierz Tymieniecki =

Polish historian (1887–1968)

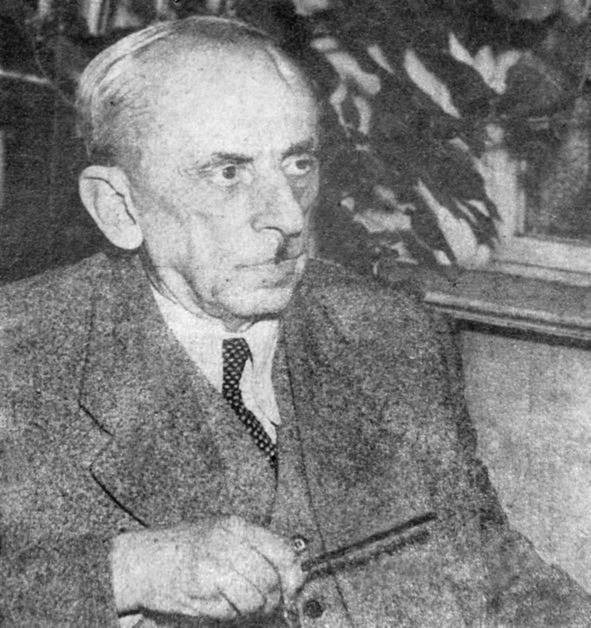
- Kazimierz Tymieniecki
- Born: 19 December 1887; Kielce
- Died: 13 October 1968 (aged 80); Poznań
- Occupation: Historian

Academic background
- Education: Jagiellonian University
- Doctoral advisor: Stanisław Krzyżanowski (medievalist)

Kazimierz Dionizy Tymieniecki (19 December 1887 – 13 October 1968) was a historian.

== Biography ==
He was the second out of three children of Jan, advocate, and Zofia née Chelińska. He spent his childhood and early youth in Mokrsko and Kielce. As a sixth-grade student of the secondary school (gimnazjum) in Kielce, he was expelled as a result of tsarist repression for participating in a school strike (January–February 1905). In 1906 he began education at the private Chrzanowski Gymnasium in Warsaw. He passed his secondary school leaving examination in June 1907.

In 1912 he obtained doctorate at the Jagiellonian University, upon dissertation supervised by Stanisław Krzyżanowski.

== Works ==
- Procesy twórcze formowania się społeczeństwa polskiego w wiekach średnich. 1921.
- Społeczeństwo Słowian lechickich (Ród i Plemię). 1928.
- Dzieje Niemiec od początku ery nowożytnej. 1948.
- Ziemie polskie w starożytności. 1951.

== Bibliography ==
- Labuda, Gerard (1989). "Kazimierz Tymieniecki (1887–1968)". In Jerzy Strzelczyk (ed.). Wybitni historycy wielkopolscy. Poznań. pp. 314–331.
- Jerzy Strzelczyk, ed. (1990). Kazimierz Tymieniecki (1887–1968): dorobek i miejsce w mediewistyce polskiej. Poznań: Uniwersytet im. Adama Mickiewicza.
- Wielgosz, Zbigniew (1996). "Wstęp". In Jerzy Strzelczyk (ed.). Kazimierz Tymieniecki, Kształtowanie się społeczeństwa średniowiecznego, t. 1: Procesy twórcze formowania się społeczeństwa polskiego w wiekach średnich. Poznań. pp. 11–53.
- Wielgosz, Zbigniew (2007). "Wstęp. Kazimierz Tymieniecki – Człowiek i dzieło – Twórca nowoczesnej mediewistyki polskiej". Kazimierz Tymieniecki. Z dziejów miast i mieszczaństwa w późnośredniowiecznej Wielkopolsce. Poznań. pp. 9–33.
- Jarosław Nikodem, ed. (2019). Kazimierz Tymieniecki. W pięćdziesiątą rocznicę śmierci mistrza nauk mediewistycznych. Poznań: Instytut Historii UAM. Review: Gąsiorowski, Antoni (1 December 2020). "Pamięć o profesorze Kazimierzu Tymienieckim". Roczniki Historyczne. 86: 249–253.
- "Tymieniecki Kazimierz (1887–1968)". Polski Słownik Biograficzny. Vol. LVI/3. 2026.
