= Brzegi =

Brzegi may refer to the following villages in Poland:

- Brzegi, Tatra County in Lesser Poland Voivodeship (south Poland)
- Brzegi, Wieliczka County in Lesser Poland Voivodeship (south Poland)
- Brzegi, Masovian Voivodeship (east-central Poland)
- Brzegi, Świętokrzyskie Voivodeship (south-central Poland)
- Brzegi, Greater Poland Voivodeship (west-central Poland)
