= Chomentów =

- Village
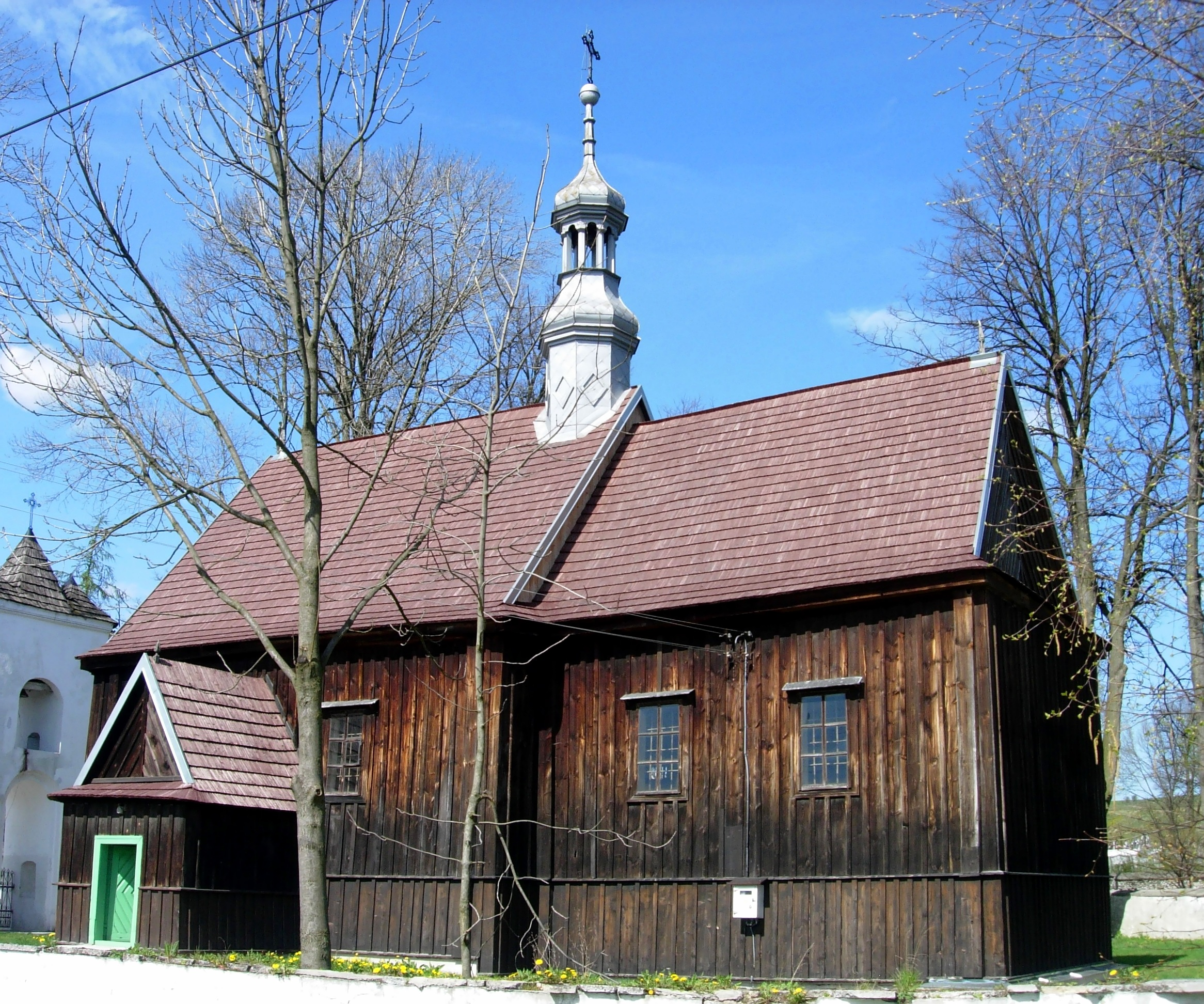
- Saint Mary Magdalene Church

- Location within Poland
- Coordinates: 50°40′52″N 20°31′56″E
- Country: Poland
- Voivodeship: Świętokrzyskie
- County: Jędrzejów
- Gmina: Sobków

Chomentów [xɔˈmɛntuf] is a village in the administrative district of Gmina Sobków, within Jędrzejów County, Świętokrzyskie Voivodeship, in south-central Poland. It lies approximately 6 km (4 mi) east of Sobków, 18 km (11 mi) east of Jędrzejów, and 24 km (15 mi) south of the regional capital Kielce.

As of 2020, the village had 407 inhabitants.
