= Feliksówka, Świętokrzyskie Voivodeship =

Feliksówka
- Village
- Location within Poland
- Coordinates: 50°42′44″N 20°30′42″E
- Country: Poland
- Voivodeship: Świętokrzyskie
- County: Jędrzejów
- Gmina: Sobków

Feliksówka (Polish pronunciation: [fɛlikˈsufka]) is a village in the administrative district of Gmina Sobków, within Jędrzejów County, Świętokrzyskie Voivodeship, in south-central Poland.
