= Brzegi Małe =

- Village
- Location within Poland
- Coordinates: 50°44′11″N 20°22′42″E
- Country: Poland
- Voivodeship: Świętokrzyskie
- County: Jędrzejów
- Gmina: Sobków

Brzegi Małe [ˈbʐɛɡimawɛ] is a village in the administrative district of Gmina Sobków, within Jędrzejów County, Świętokrzyskie Voivodeship, in south-central Poland.
