= Żerniki, Jędrzejów County =

Żerniki
- Village
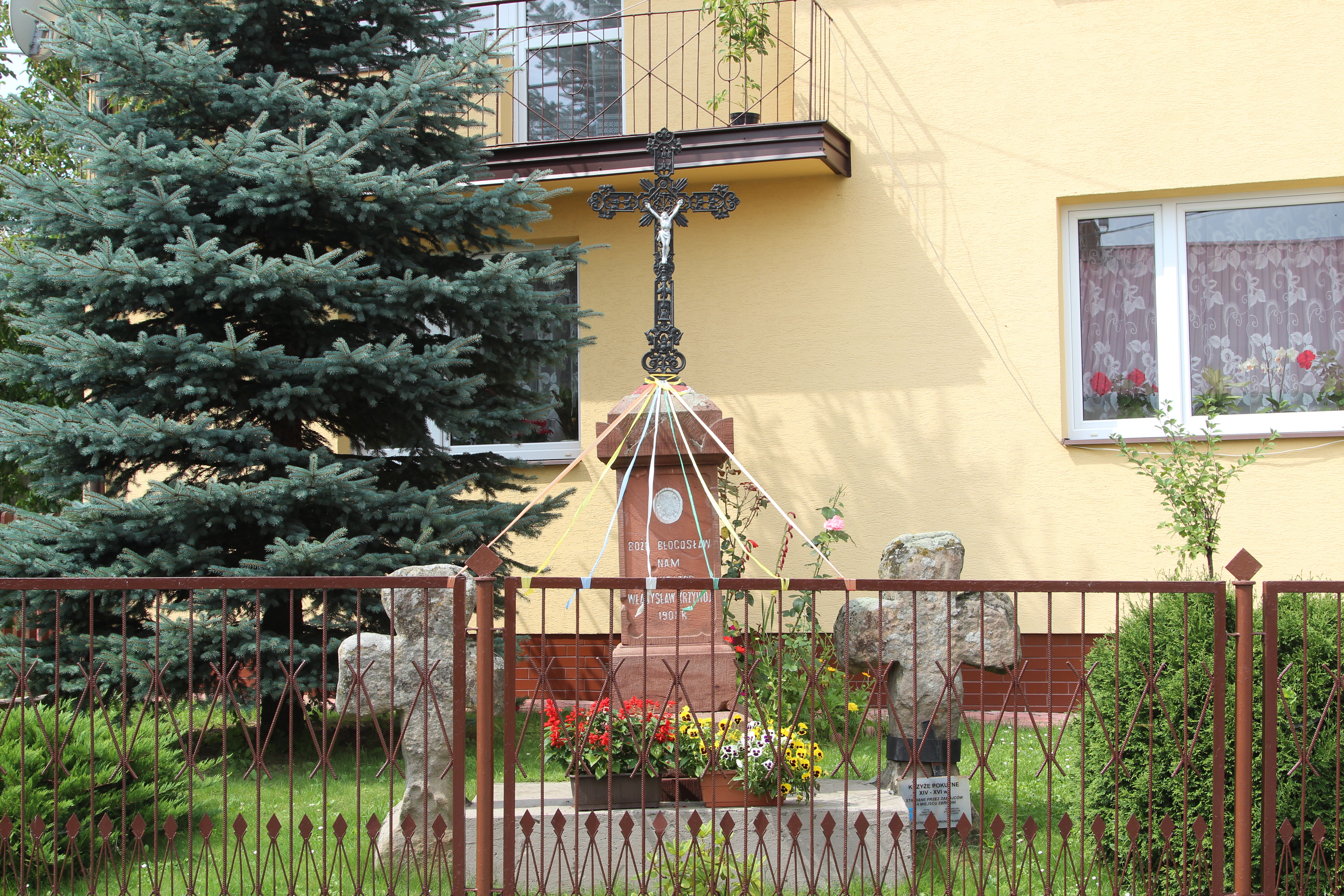

- Location within Poland
- Coordinates: 50°45′17″N 20°24′12″E
- Country: Poland
- Voivodeship: Świętokrzyskie
- County: Jędrzejów
- Gmina: Sobków

Żerniki (Polish pronunciation: [ʐɛrˈɲikʲi]) is a village in the administrative district of Gmina Sobków, within Jędrzejów County, Świętokrzyskie Voivodeship, in south-central Poland. It lies approximately 8 km (5 mi) north-west of Sobków, 16 km (10 mi) north-east of Jędrzejów, and 21 km (13 mi) south-west of the regional capital Kielce.
