= Szczepanów =

Szczepanów is a Polish toponym derived from "Szczepan" - a variant of "Stephan". Hence, places getting that name is likely to be the result of a person named Szczepan having had a significant role in local history.

The name may refer to the following places in Poland:

- Szczepanów, Kamienna Góra County in Lower Silesian Voivodeship (south-west Poland)
- Szczepanów, Gmina Środa Śląska in Środa County, Lower Silesian Voivodeship (south-west Poland)
- Szczepanów, Świdnica County in Lower Silesian Voivodeship (south-west Poland)
- Szczepanów, Lesser Poland Voivodeship (south Poland)
- Szczepanów, Świętokrzyskie Voivodeship (south-central Poland)
- Szczepanów, Greater Poland Voivodeship (central Poland)
- Szczepanów, Lubusz Voivodeship (west Poland)
