= Brzeźno, Świętokrzyskie Voivodeship =

Brzeźno
- Village
- Location within Poland
- Coordinates: 50°42′52″N 20°25′32″E
- Country: Poland
- Voivodeship: Świętokrzyskie
- County: Jędrzejów
- Gmina: Sobków

Brzeźno [ˈbʐɛʑnɔ] is a village in the administrative district of Gmina Sobków, within Jędrzejów County, Świętokrzyskie Voivodeship, in south-central Poland. It lies approximately 3 km (2 mi) north-west of Sobków, 13 km (8 mi) north-east of Jędrzejów, and 24 km (15 mi) south-west of the regional capital Kielce.
