= Stare Kotlice =

- Village
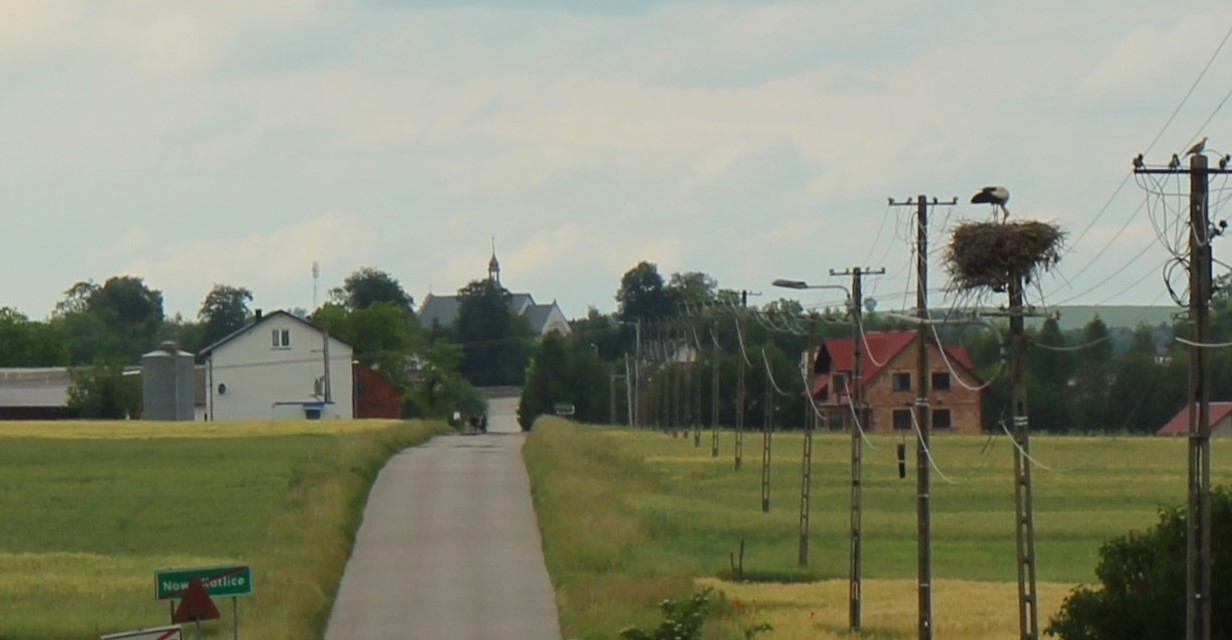

- Location within Poland
- Coordinates: 50°39′17″N 20°28′5″E
- Country: Poland
- Voivodeship: Świętokrzyskie
- County: Jędrzejów
- Gmina: Sobków

Stare Kotlice [ˈstarɛ kɔtˈlit͡sɛ] is a village in the administrative district of Gmina Sobków, within Jędrzejów County, Świętokrzyskie Voivodeship, in south-central Poland. It lies approximately 5 km (3 mi) south of Sobków, 13 km (8 mi) east of Jędrzejów, and 28 km (17 mi) south of the regional capital Kielce.
