= Varvara Savelieva =

- Born: 22 June 1928; Ponomarenky, Kharkiv Raion, Kharkiv Okruha, Ukrainian SSR
- Died: 25 July 2016 (aged 88); Bezliudivka, Kharkiv Oblast, Ukraine
- Awards: Hero of Socialist Labor (1966); Order of Lenin
- Scientific career
- Fields: Milkwoman

Varvara Fedorivna Savelieva (June 22, 1928, village Ponomarenky, now Kharkiv region of Kharkiv region - July 25, 2016, town Bezliudivka of Kharkiv district of Kharkiv region) - Ukrainian Soviet innovator of agricultural production, milkwoman of the state farm "Bezliudivsky" of Kharkiv district of Kharkiv region. Hero of Socialist Labor (From March 22, 1966). Member of the Central Committee of the CPU in 1961–1966.

== Biography ==
Born in a peasant family. Since 1948 she has been working as a milkwoman in the collective farm "Peremoha" (state farm "Bezliudivsky") in the Kharkiv region of the Kharkiv region. Each year, on average, provided over 4000 kg of milk from each of the 100 cows. One of the first in the Ukrainian SSR went to large-scale cows maintenance.

Member of the CPSU since 1957. The delegate of the XXII, XXIV, XXVI congresses of the CPSU, as well as the XXII and XXIII congresses of the Communist Party of Ukraine.

Then - on a pension in the town Bezliudivka of the Kharkiv district of the Kharkiv region.

== Awards ==
- Hero of Socialist Labor (March 22, 1966)
- Order of Lenin (March 22, 1966)
- orders
- medals
- Laureate of the State Prize of the Ukrainian SSR (1975)
- honorary citizen of Kharkiv region (9.08.2001)

== Sources ==
- Українська радянська енциклопедія. Том 9, К., 1983.
