= Choiny, Świętokrzyskie Voivodeship =

Choiny
- Village
- Location within Poland
- Coordinates: 50°46′3″N 20°23′13″E
- Country: Poland
- Voivodeship: Świętokrzyskie
- County: Jędrzejów
- Gmina: Sobków

Choiny [ˈxɔi̯nɨ] is a village in the administrative district of Gmina Sobków, within Jędrzejów County, Świętokrzyskie Voivodeship, in south-central Poland. It lies approximately 10 km (6 mi) north-west of Sobków, 17 km (11 mi) north of Jędrzejów, and 21 km (13 mi) south-west of the regional capital Kielce.
