= Lake Pidborivske =

Coordinates: 49°52′45″N 36°15′37″E

- Підборівське озеро (Ukrainian)
- Location within Kharkiv Oblast
- Location: Bezliudivka, Kharkiv Oblast, Ukraine
- Type: Anthropogenic lake
- Basin countries: Ukraine
- Islands: 1
- Settlements: Bezliudivka

Lake Pidborivske (Ukrainian: Підборівське озеро) is a lake located in the north of rural settlement of Bezliudivka in Kharkiv Raion, Kharkiv Oblast of Ukraine. It is often visited by residents of Kharkiv for recreation. On the lake there is a water park "Alexandra", "White Beach" and "Pisochnytsia" beach.

The name comes from the Bezliudivka district, called "Pidborivka"
