= Sokoloff =

Sokoloff, a surname, may refer to:

- Alexandra Sokoloff, American novelist and screenwriter
- Eleanor Sokoloff (1914–2020), American pianist
- Kenneth Sokoloff (1952–2007), American economic historian
- Marla Sokoloff (born 1980), American actress
- Melvin Sokoloff (1929–1990), stage name Mel Lewis, American jazz musician/drummer
- Nahum Sokolow or Sokoloff (1859–1936), Zionist leader and journalist
- Nikolai Sokoloff (1886–1965), Russian American conductor and violinist
- Vladimir Sokoloff (1889–1962), Hollywood character actor born in Russia
- Vladimir Sokoloff (pianist), (1913–1997), American pianist

== See also ==
- Phil Sokolof (1921–2004), American health activist
- Sokolov (surname)
- Sokolow, surname
- Sokołów (disambiguation)
