= Osowa, Świętokrzyskie Voivodeship =

Osowa
- Village
- Location within Poland
- Coordinates: 50°42′41″N 20°23′28″E
- Country: Poland
- Voivodeship: Świętokrzyskie
- County: Jędrzejów
- Gmina: Sobków

Osowa [ɔˈsɔva] is a village in the administrative district of Gmina Sobków, within Jędrzejów County, Świętokrzyskie Voivodeship, in south-central Poland. It lies approximately 5 km (3 mi) west of Sobków, 11 km (7 mi) north-east of Jędrzejów, and 25 km (16 mi) south-west of the regional capital Kielce.
