= Sokołów Górny =

- Village
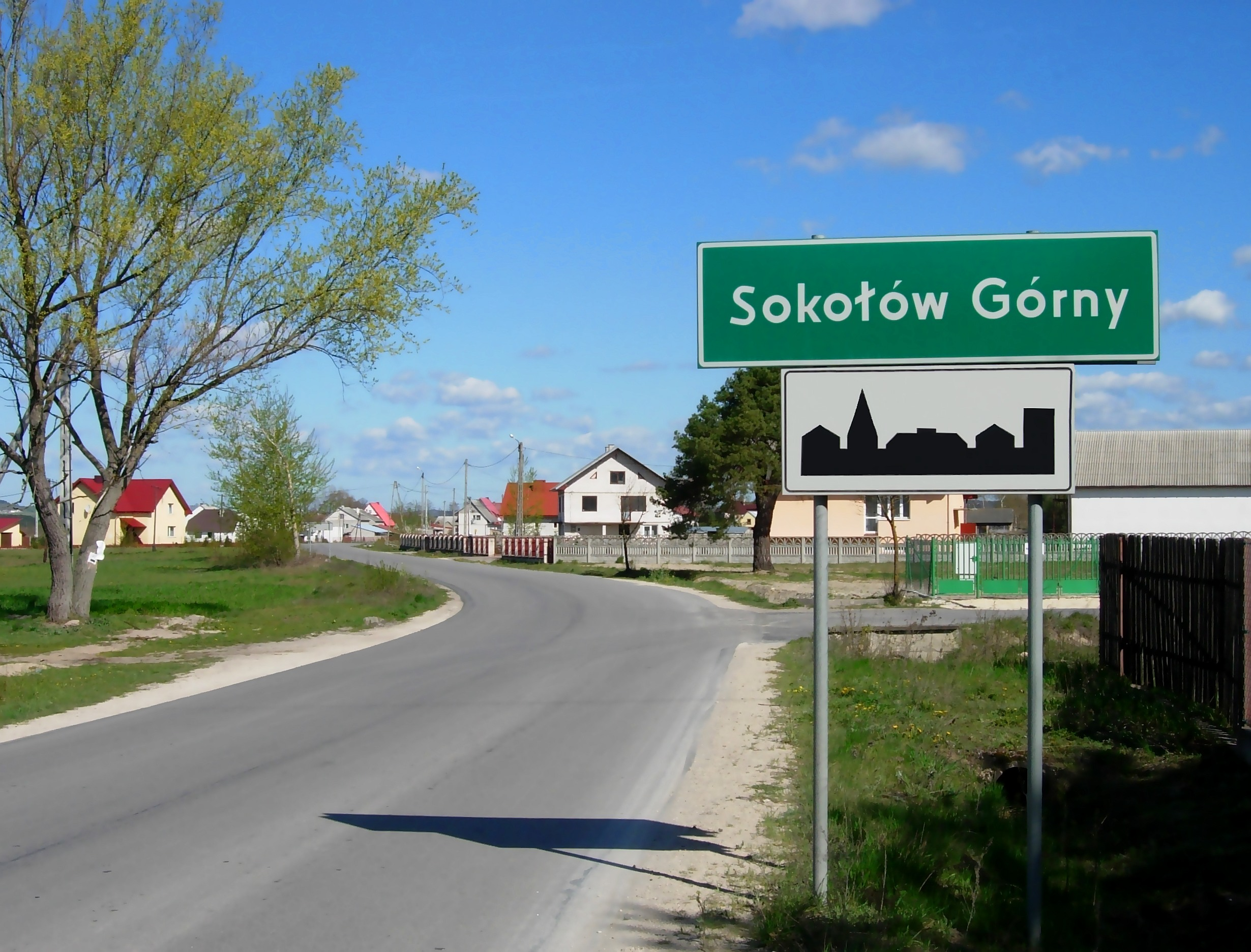
- Entrance to the village Sokołów Górny

- Location within Poland
- Coordinates: 50°44′N 20°27′E
- Country: Poland
- Voivodeship: Świętokrzyskie
- County: Jędrzejów
- Gmina: Sobków

Sokołów Górny [sɔˈkɔwuf ˈɡurnɨ] is a village in the administrative district of Gmina Sobków, within Jędrzejów County, Świętokrzyskie Voivodeship, in south-central Poland. It lies approximately 4 km (2 mi) north of Sobków, 16 km (10 mi) north-east of Jędrzejów, and 21 km (13 mi) south-west of the regional capital Kielce.
