= Brzegi, Świętokrzyskie Voivodeship =

Brzegi
- Village
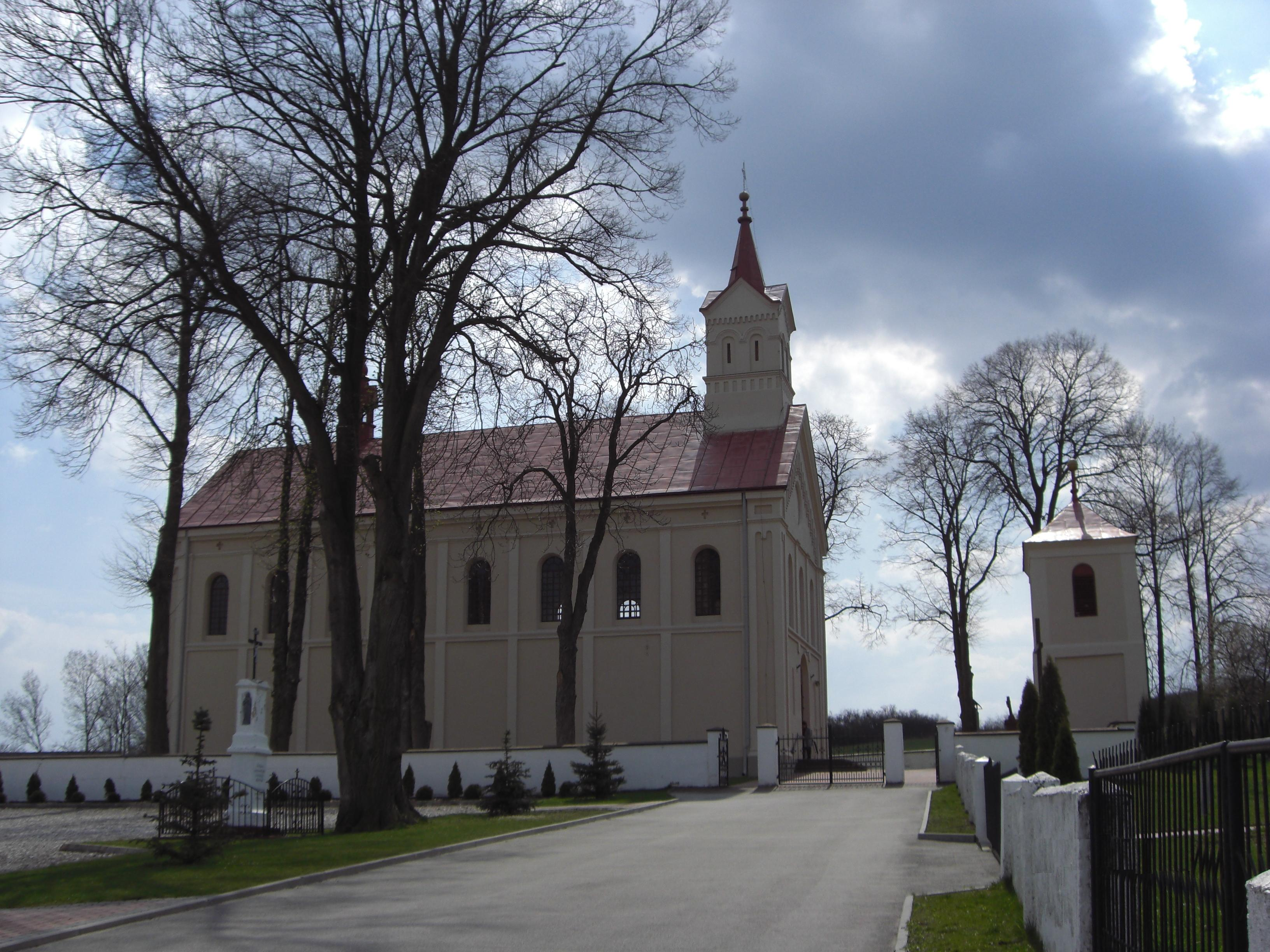
- Catholic church

- Location within Poland
- Coordinates: 50°44′24″N 20°24′11″E
- Country: Poland
- Voivodeship: Świętokrzyskie
- County: Jędrzejów
- Gmina: Sobków

Brzegi [ˈbʐɛɡi] is a village in the administrative district of Gmina Sobków, within Jędrzejów County, Świętokrzyskie Voivodeship, in south-central Poland. It lies approximately 6 km (4 mi) north-west of Sobków, 14 km (9 mi) north-east of Jędrzejów, and 22 km (14 mi) south-west of the regional capital Kielce.
