= Lake Nahorivske =

Coordinates: 49°51′23″N 36°16′42″E

- Нагорівське озеро (Ukrainian)
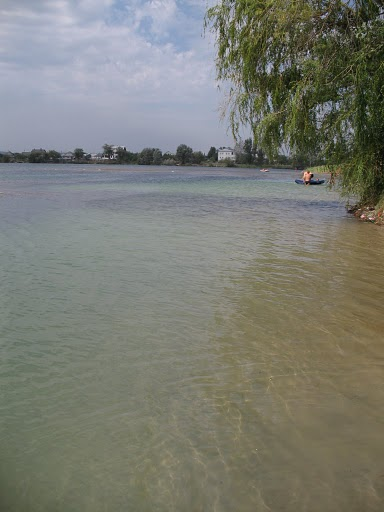

- Location within Kharkiv Oblast
- Location: Bezliudivka, Kharkiv Oblast, Ukraine
- Type: Anthropogenic lake
- Basin countries: Ukraine
- Islands: 1
- Settlements: Bezliudivka

Lake Nahorivske (Ukrainian: Нагорівське озеро) is a lake located in the south of rural settlement of Bezliudivka in Kharkiv Raion, Kharkiv Oblast of Ukraine. It is often visited by residents of Kharkiv for recreation. On the lake there are two beaches of private enterprises "Agat" and LLC "Federation of Boxing and Kickboxing". Near the lake there is a sand pit.

This lake is separated by a spit from the neighboring Kovalenky Lake.

The name comes from the Bezliudivka district, called "Nahorivka".
