= Sokołów Dolny =

- Village
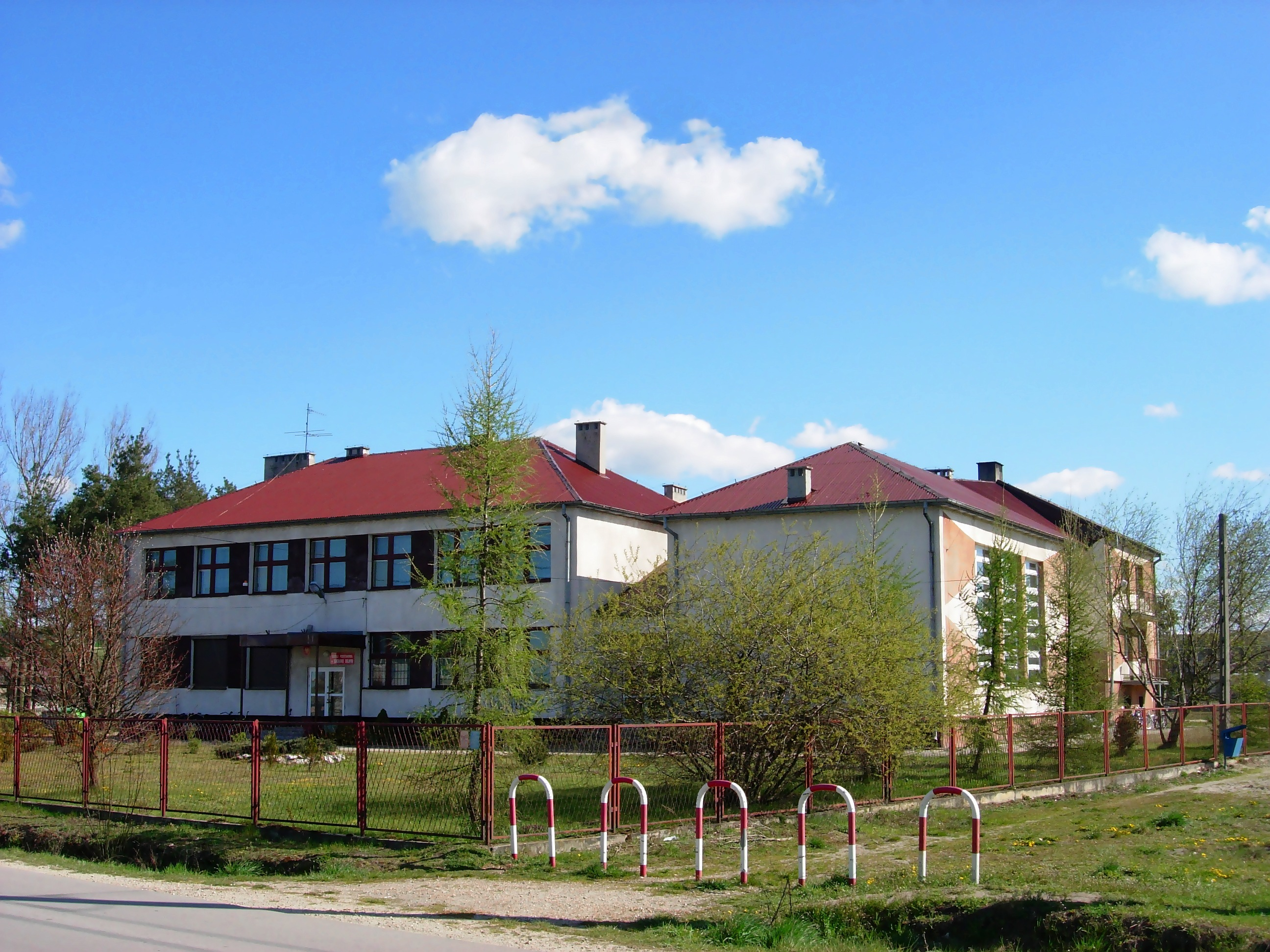
- School

- Location within Poland
- Coordinates: 50°44′N 20°26′E
- Country: Poland
- Voivodeship: Świętokrzyskie
- County: Jędrzejów
- Gmina: Sobków

Sokołów Dolny [sɔˈkɔwuf ˈdɔlnɨ] is a village in the administrative district of Gmina Sobków, within Jędrzejów County, Świętokrzyskie Voivodeship, in south-central Poland. It lies approximately 5 km (3 mi) north of Sobków, 15 km (9 mi) north-east of Jędrzejów, and 22 km (14 mi) south-west of the regional capital Kielce.
