= Niziny, Jędrzejów County =

Niziny
- Village
- Location within Poland
- Coordinates: 50°40′43″N 20°30′52″E
- Country: Poland
- Voivodeship: Świętokrzyskie
- County: Jędrzejów
- Gmina: Sobków

Niziny [niˈʑinɨ] is a village in the administrative district of Gmina Sobków, within Jędrzejów County, Świętokrzyskie Voivodeship, in south-central Poland. It lies approximately 5 km (3 mi) south-east of Sobków, 16 km (10 mi) east of Jędrzejów, and 24 km (15 mi) south of the regional capital Kielce.
