= Mokrsko Dolne =

- Village
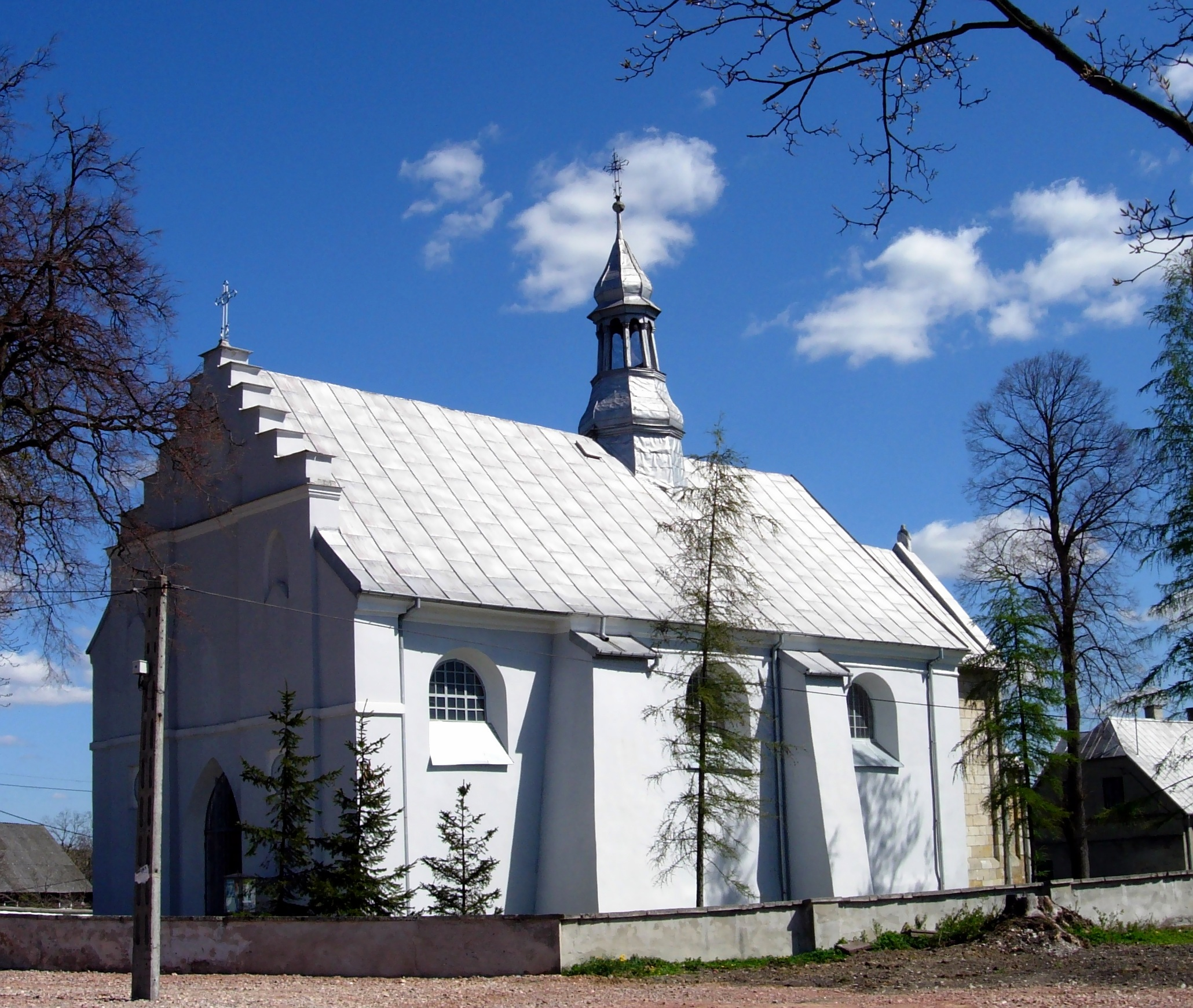
- Assumption of Virgin Mary Church

- Location within Poland
- Coordinates: 50°40′52″N 20°26′22″E
- Country: Poland
- Voivodeship: Świętokrzyskie
- County: Jędrzejów
- Gmina: Sobków

Mokrsko Dolne [ˈmɔkrskɔ ˈdɔlnɛ] is a village in the administrative district of Gmina Sobków, within Jędrzejów County, Świętokrzyskie Voivodeship, in south-central Poland. It lies approximately 3 km (2 mi) south-west of Sobków, 12 km (7 mi) north-east of Jędrzejów, and 26 km (16 mi) south-west of the regional capital Kielce.
