= Mzurowa =

- Village
- Location within Poland
- Coordinates: 50°43′17″N 20°20′37″E
- Country: Poland
- Voivodeship: Świętokrzyskie
- County: Jędrzejów
- Gmina: Sobków

Mzurowa [mzuˈrɔva] is a village in the administrative district of Gmina Sobków, within Jędrzejów County, Świętokrzyskie Voivodeship, in south-central Poland. It lies approximately 9 km (6 mi) west of Sobków, 11 km (7 mi) north of Jędrzejów, and 27 km (17 mi) south-west of the regional capital Kielce.
