= Bezliudivka =

Rural locality in Kharkiv Oblast, Ukraine

Bezliudivka Безлюдівка
- Rural settlement
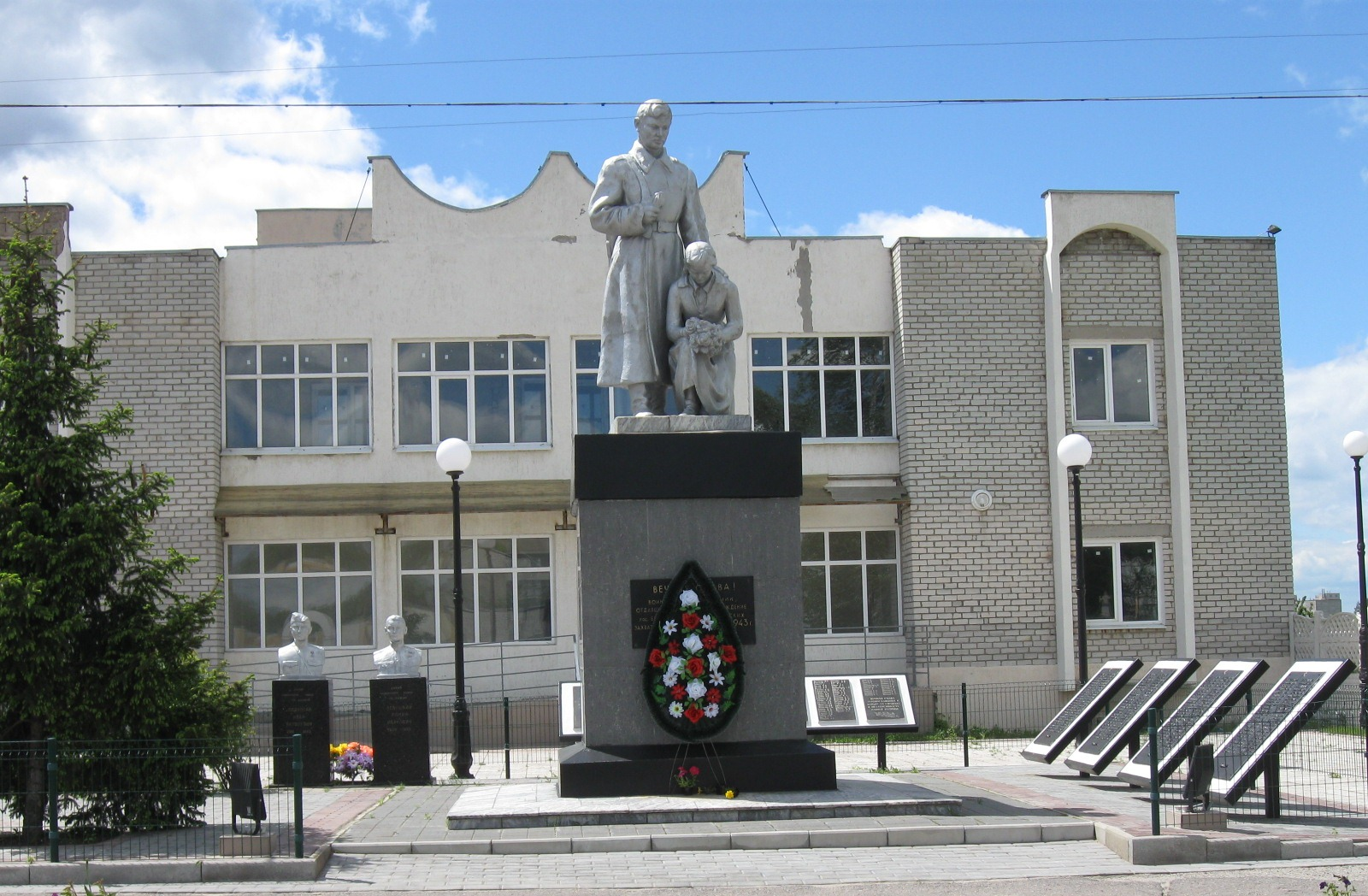

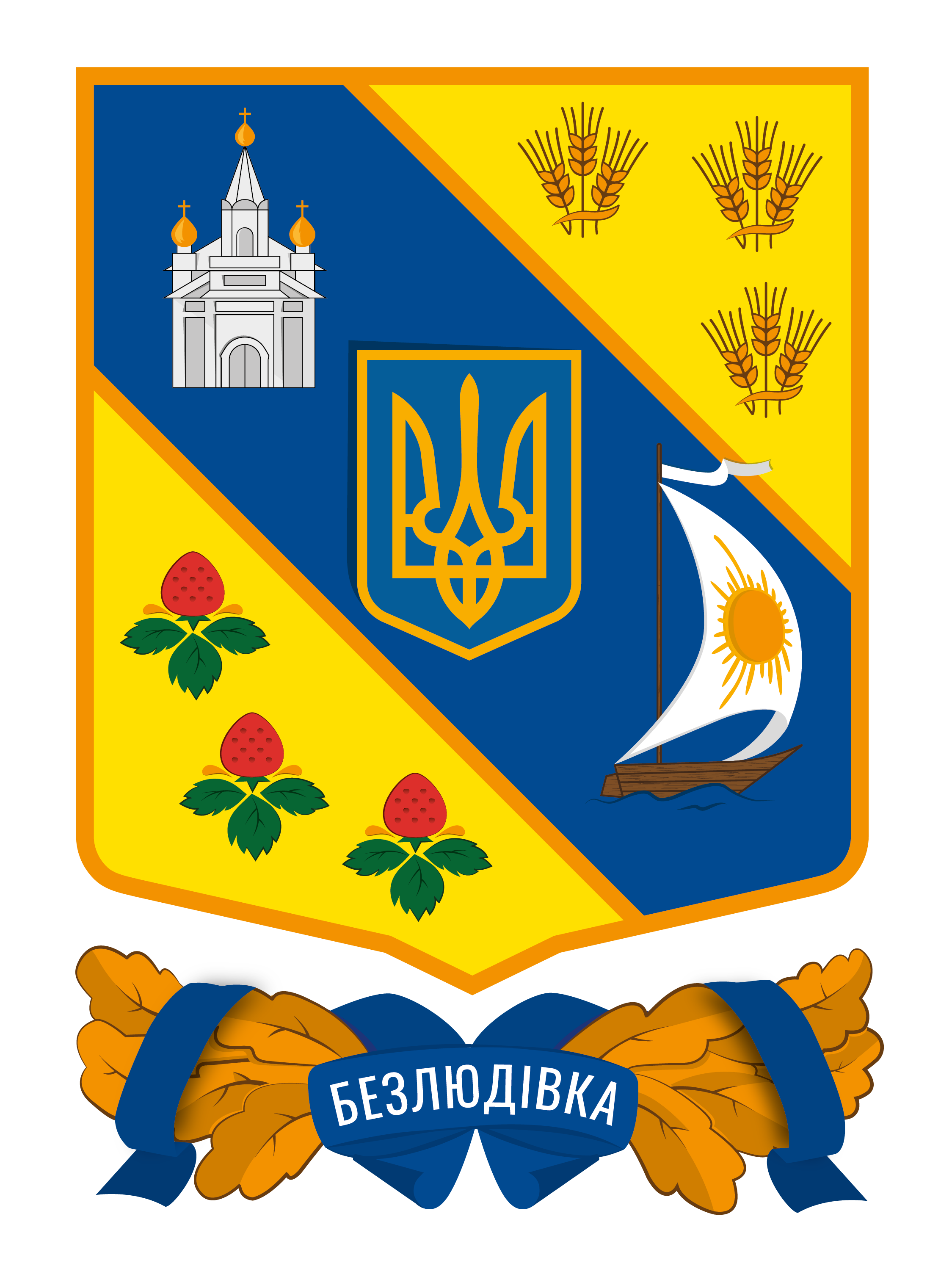

- Location in Kharkiv Oblast Location in Ukraine
- Coordinates: 49°52′09″N 36°16′11″E
- Country: Ukraine
- Oblast: Kharkiv Oblast
- Raion: Kharkiv Raion
- Hromada: Bezliudivka settlement hromada

Area
  - Total: 77 km^{2} (30 sq mi)
- Elevation: 105 m (344 ft)

Population
  - Total: 9,135
  - Density: 120/km^{2} (310/sq mi)
- Time zone: UTC+2 (EET)
  - Summer (DST): UTC+3 (EEST)

Bezliudivka (Ukrainian: Безлюдівка) is a rural settlement located in Kharkiv Raion of Kharkiv Oblast in eastern Ukraine. It is adjacent to the southern boundary of the city of Kharkiv and is situated on the Udy River (Seversky Donets Basin), 3 km from the railway stop. Bezliudivka hosts the administration of Bezliudivka settlement hromada, one of the hromadas of Ukraine. Population: 9,135 (2022 estimate).

Lake Nahorivske and Lake Pidborivske are located in the settlement.

== History ==
Bezlyudivka was first mentioned in 1677.

It was a village in Kharkov uyezd of Kharkov Governorate of the Russian Empire.

In 1938, it was classified as an urban-type settlement.

It is estimated that 988 inhabitants of Bezludivka had fought in the World War II, 124 of them died, 798 were awarded orders and medals of the Soviet Union.

In 1964 the Sovkhoz "Bezliudivsky" was formed here.

In January 1989 the population was 10 387 people.

In January 2013 the population was 9698 people.

In January 2018 the population was 9436 people.

Until 26 January 2024, Bezliudivka was designated urban-type settlement. On this day, a new law entered into force which abolished this status, and Bezliudivka became a rural settlement.

== Economy and culture ==
Bezliudivka is located near a large sand quarry. There is a Judicial Lyceum, another lyceum, clinic, library, club.
