= Gmina Sobków =

Gmina Sobków Sobków Commune
- Gmina
- Flag Coat of arms
- Interactive map of Gmina Sobków
- Coordinates (Sobków): 50°41′51″N 20°27′15″E
- Country: Poland
- Voivodeship: Świętokrzyskie
- County: Jędrzejów
- Seat: Sobków

Area
  - Total: 145.5 km^{2} (56.2 sq mi)

Population (2006)
  - Total: 8,266
  - Density: 56.81/km^{2} (147.1/sq mi)
- Website: http://www.sobkow.uti.pl/

Gmina Sobków is a rural gmina (administrative district) in Jędrzejów County, Świętokrzyskie Voivodeship, in south-central Poland. Its seat is the village of Sobków, which lies approximately 14 kilometres (9 mi) north-east of Jędrzejów and 24 km (15 mi) south-west of the regional capital Kielce.

The gmina covers an area of 145.5 square kilometres (56.2 sq mi), and as of 2006 its total population is 8,266.

The gmina contains part of the protected area called Chęciny-Kielce Landscape Park.

== Villages ==
Gmina Sobków contains the villages and settlements of Bizoręda, Brzegi, Brzeźno, Choiny, Chomentów, Jawór, Karsy, Korytnica, Lipa, Miąsowa, Mokrsko Dolne, Mokrsko Górne, Mzurowa, Niziny, Nowe Kotlice, Osowa, Sobków, Sokołów Dolny, Sokołów Górny, Staniowice, Stare Kotlice, Szczepanów, Wierzbica, Wólka Kawęcka and Żerniki.

== Neighbouring gminas ==
Gmina Sobków is bordered by the gminas of Chęciny, Imielno, Jędrzejów, Kije, Małogoszcz and Morawica.
