= Sobków =

- Town
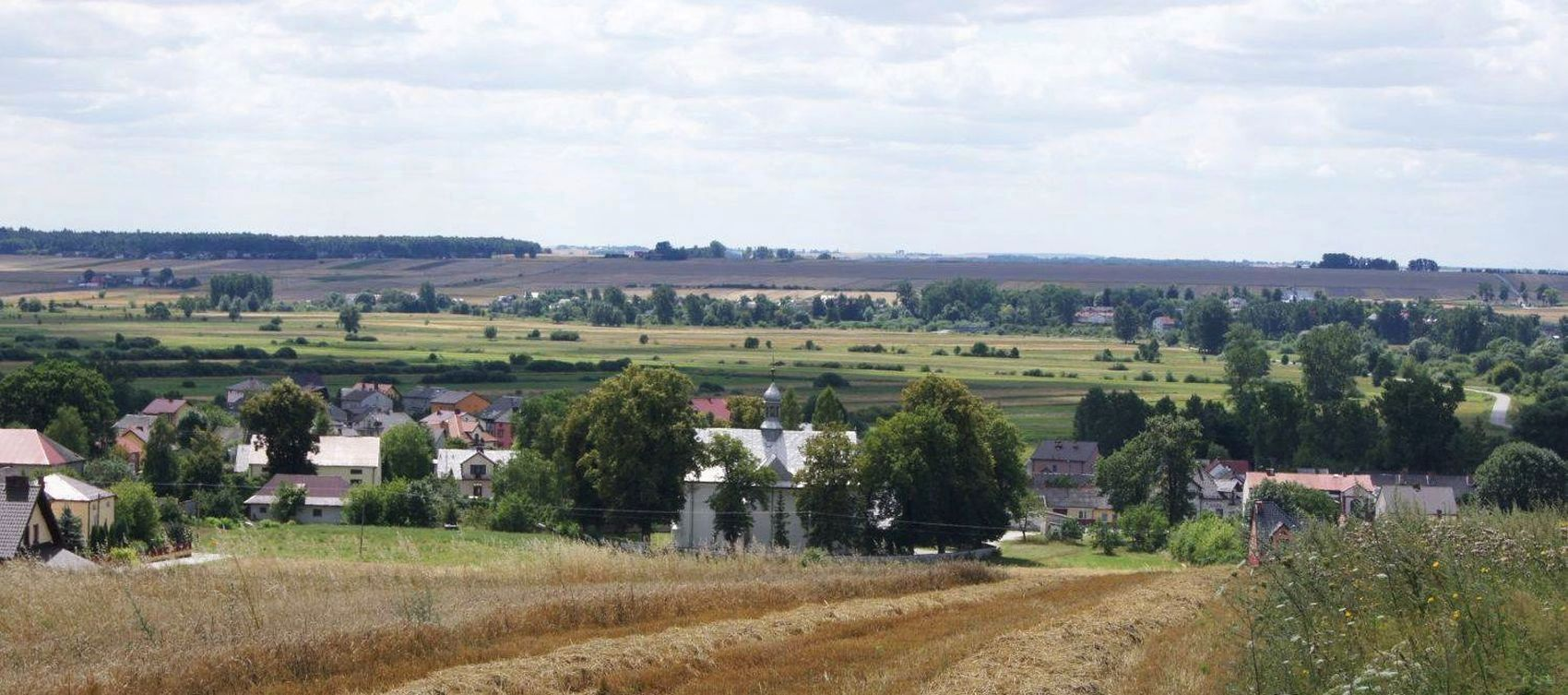
- Sobków

- Flag Coat of arms

- Location within Poland
- Coordinates: 50°41′51″N 20°27′15″E
- Country: Poland
- Voivodeship: Świętokrzyskie
- County: Jędrzejów
- Gmina: Sobków
- Established: 1563
- Founder: Stanisław Sobek
- Named for: Stanisław Sobek

Population (approx.)
  - Total: 870
- Time zone: UTC+1 (CET)
  - Summer (DST): UTC+2 (CEST)
- Postal code: 28-305
- Vehicle registration: TJE

Sobków [ˈsɔpkuf] is a town in Jędrzejów County, Świętokrzyskie Voivodeship, in south-central Poland. It is the seat of the gmina (administrative district) called Gmina Sobków. It lies in historic Lesser Poland, approximately 14 km (9 mi) north-east of Jędrzejów and 24 km (15 mi) south-west of the regional capital Kielce.

The village is located on the left bank of the Nida river. Sobkow has a railway station, which is located three kilometers northwest of the village, along a main line from Kraków to Kielce.

== History ==
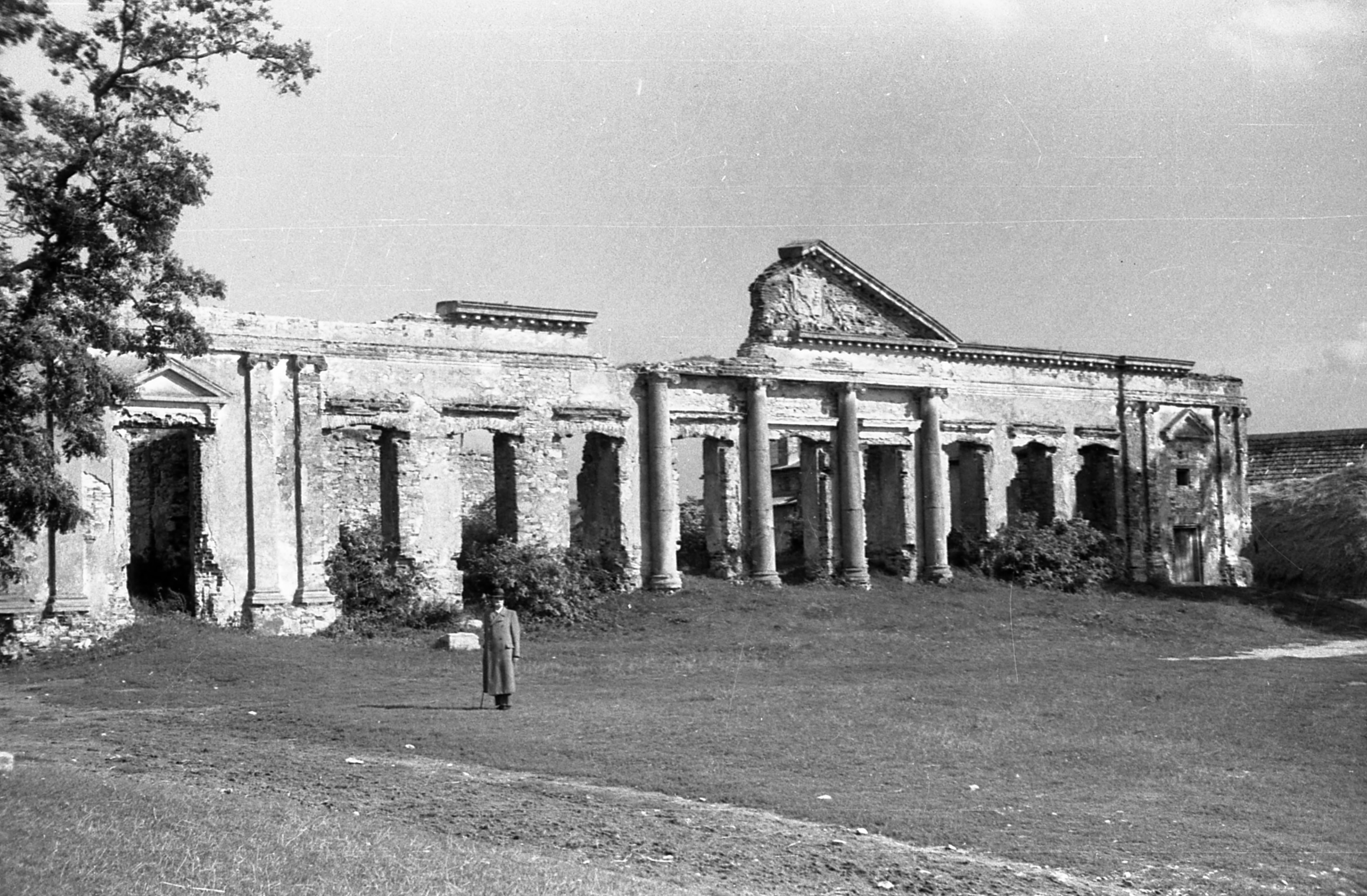
Fortalicja in the 1940s

It was founded as a town in 1563 by Grand Treasurer of the Crown Stanisław Sobek in the area of the village of Nida, and named after him. The Brochwicz coat of arms of the Sobek family remains included in the coat of arms of Sobków. Together with the town, Sobek founded a castle, which became main residence of his family. In the 17th and 18th centuries, the private town belonged to several families, such as the Drohojewski, the Wielopolski, the Sarbiewski, the Myszkowski, and the Szaniawski (since 1725). Sobków remained a small town, whose development was limited due to proximity of well-established local urban and trade centers at Checiny and Jędrzejów. In 1667, while part of Sandomierz Voivodeship in the Lesser Poland Province, it had only 32 houses, with a population of 270. King Augustus II the Strong established 12 annual fairs. In 1778, the old privileges were confirmed by King Stanisław August Poniatowski.

After the Third Partition of Poland (1795), it was annexed by Austria. After the Polish victory in the Austro-Polish War of 1809, it became part of the short-lived Duchy of Warsaw. In 1815, it became part of Russian-controlled Congress Poland. Following the example of many other places in northern Lesser Poland, Sobków lost its town charter in 1869, after the January Uprising. During World War I, the village was completely burned (1915). In 1918, Poland regained independence and control of Sobków. During World War II, it was occupied by Germany.

== Sights ==
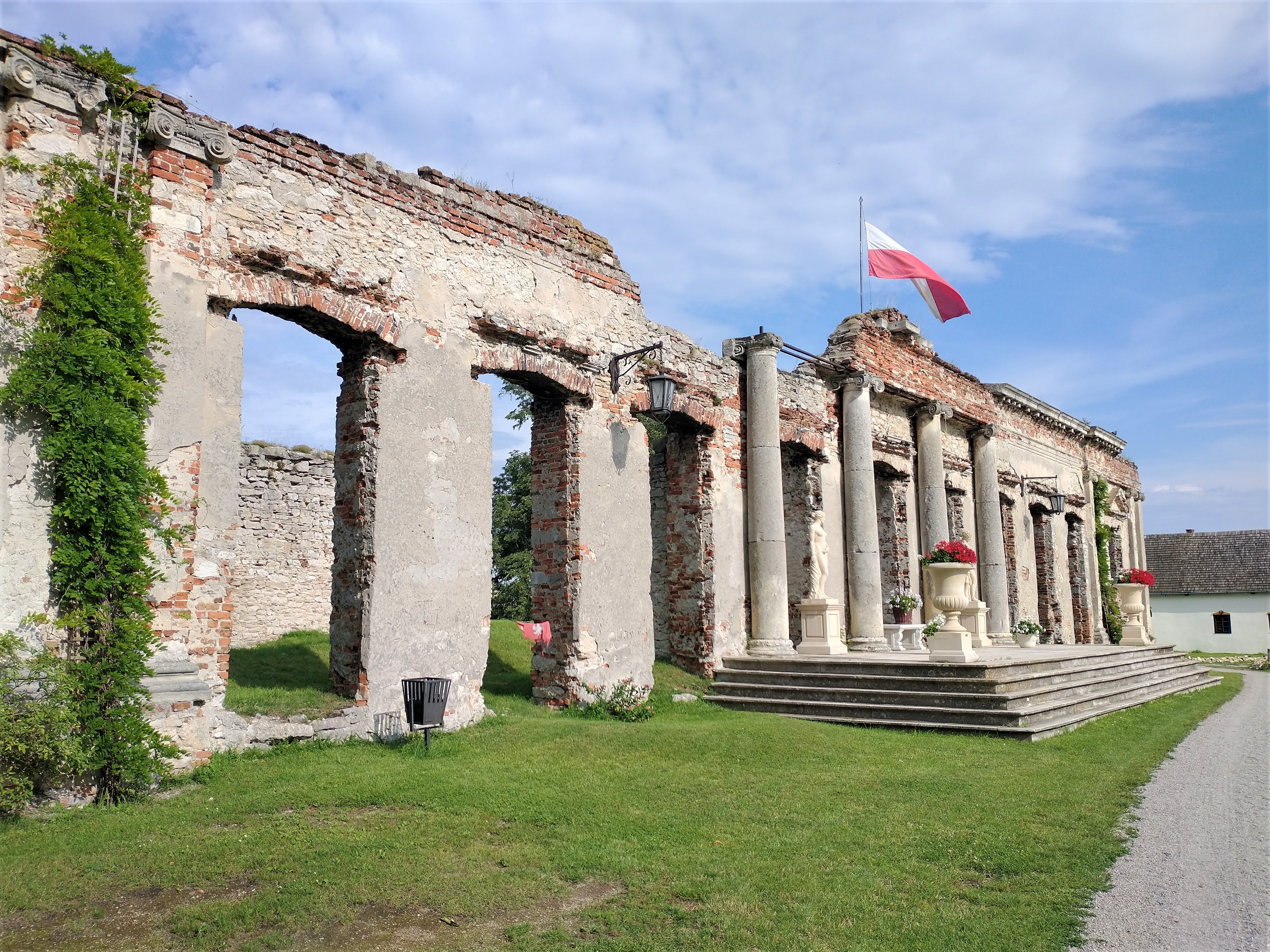
Fortalicja

Most interesting sight at Sobków is a fortified castle, called Fortalicja sobkowska. It was built on the left bank of the Nida by Stanisław Sobek, in 1560–1570. The castle is surrounded by a rectangular wall, with towers in each corner. Inside the walls the castle once stood. The original castle was replaced by a Classicist complex in 1767. Now it is in ruins. Furthermore, Sobków has the St. Stanislaus church, built in the mid-16th century as a Calvinist prayer house. In ca. 1570 the house was handed over to Roman Catholic Church by Stanislaw Sobek, the son of the founder. The church has the shape of a cross, with a Baroque main altar and 18th century epitaphs. Damaged during World War II, the church was remodelled in 1945–1946.

== Demographics ==
Historical population
Year	Pop.	±%
1827	1,003	—
1858	976	−2.7%
1921	855	−12.4%
