= Breznay =

Breznay is a Hungarian language surname, which means "from Breznó". It may refer to:

- Gábor Breznay (1956–2022), Hungarian painter, who lives in Paris
- József Breznay (1916–2012), Hungarian painter

== See also ==
- Brezno, Březno (disambiguation), Brzezno (disambiguation), Brzeżno
- Breznik (disambiguation)
- Breznica (disambiguation), Brezniţa (disambiguation), Březnice (disambiguation), Bereżnica
