= Berzence =

- Village
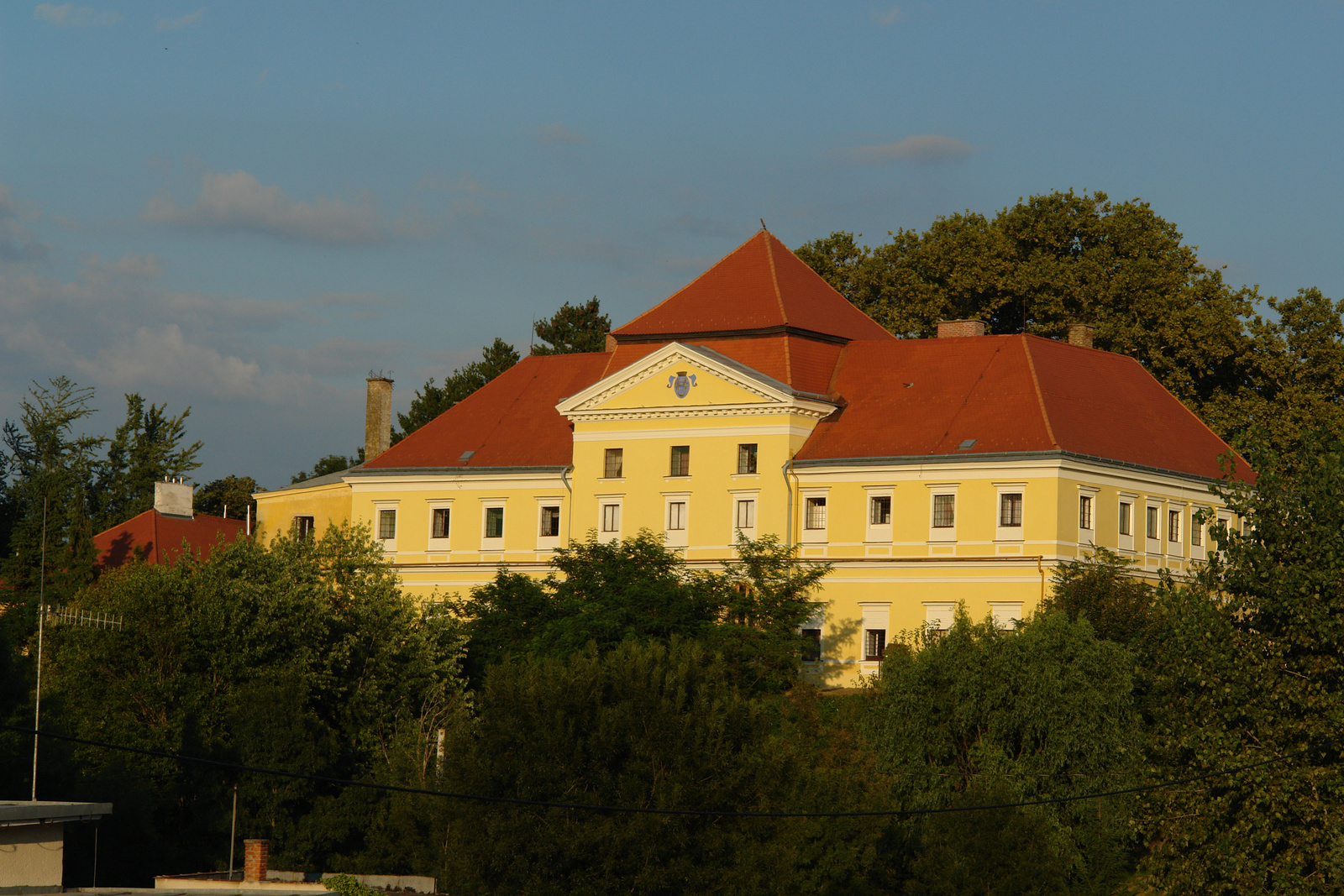
- Festetich Mansion in Berzence

- Coat of arms

- Location of Somogy county in Hungary

- Location of Berzence
- Coordinates: 46.21193°N 17.15101°E
- Country: Hungary
- Region: Southern Transdanubia
- County: Somogy
- District: Csurgó
- RC Diocese: Kaposvár
- Market town: 1758 (again 1811)

Area
  - Total: 53.76 km^{2} (20.76 sq mi)

Population (2017)
  - Total: 2,528
  - Density: 47.02/km^{2} (121.8/sq mi)
- Demonym: berzencei
- Time zone: UTC+1 (CET)
  - Summer (DST): UTC+2 (CEST)
- Postal code: 7516
- Area code: (+36) 82
- Patron Saint: Anthony of Padua
- NUTS 3 code: HU232
- MP: László Szászfalvi (KDNP)
- Website: Berzence Online

Berzence (Croatian: Brežnjica or Breznica; Slovene: Bistrica) is a village in Somogy County, Hungary, where Somogy Slovenes still live. Lankócz, Atak, Vecsernye-puszta, Szenterzsébet, Keresztfai-puszta, Perdócz-major, Garics-puszta, György-major (formerly Koplaló) and Vadaskerti-major are all parts of Berzence.

== Etymology ==
The name Berzence probably comes from the Slavic *berza—birch (see numerous Slavic place names like Breznica or Březnice). The older etymology is also Brězьnica > Brežnica which derives from bregъ—river bank. 1228 Burzence.

== Geography ==
It lies near the Hungarian-Croatian border with its own border crossing. The village can be reached by car from Nagyatád or Csurgó or by train on the Nagykanizsa-Barcs-Pécs Railway Line.

== History ==
Berzence was first mentioned between 1332 and 1337 in the annual papal tithe register with its own parish. It came in the hands of Loránt from the Pécz genus in 1377 whose successors named themselves Lorántfi de Berzence. His son György Lorántfi de Berzence won a royal deed of gift for Berzence between 1406 and 1418 which had at that time already a customs house. His sons, Sandrin and László owned beside Berzence also Szenterzsébet in 1463. György Forster de Szenterzsébet acquired their palaces in Berzence and Szenterzsébet in 1468. György Forster became the owner of the whole territory of the settlement in 1477. Its cathedral dedicated to John the Baptist was first mentioned in 1490. Forster and his wife Ilona Csapi made a contract with Orbán Nagylucsei treasurer and Bishop of Győr that Forster's daughter marry the nephew of the bishop, Ferenc and that their wealth goes on the pair after their death. In 1550 it belonged to Kelemen Zalai. Hearing of the Fell of Szigetvár in 1566 the guards of the Castle of Berzence fled, therefore the Turks could occupy it without fight. The Turks re-edified the castle. According to the military pay register between 1568 and 1569 there were 379 guards in the castle. In 1571 the settlement had only 5 households. György Zrínyi could reoccupy the castle in 1594 but soon the Turks captured it. According to the tax register of 1618-1619 the castle had 349 guards. During the Winter campaign of 1664 the Christian troops of Miklós Zrínyi recaptured the castle.

Between 1701 and 1703 Berzence was a possession of the Szalay family. In 1712 it was in majority Croatian or Slovene where out of its 13 families 7 Croatian-Slovene, 1 Serbian and 5 Hungarian. It had 20 households in 1715. During the 1720s several Croatian-Slovene families settled there. It had 47 tax payers of which 27 were Croatian-Slovene e. g. Marionics, Patranecz, Blasius, Vranics, Jankovic, Loncsar (Lončar), Marovics, Dolanecz, Sarlakovic, Petracsan, Sobosicsan, Simonsics, Panics, Pokosics, Bregovac, Virovec (Vrhovec), Persics, Kovacsevics (Kovačevič), Sarlacsevics, Jelsics, Koblar (Klobuchar) and Bosnak. Some of them came from the village of Dernye, Bács-Bodrog County (today Deronje, Serbia). In 1751 there were 22 Croatian-Slovene households and 18 Hungarian.

The village belonged to the Szalay family still in 1726, then to György Niczky in 1757, later to Kristóf Niczky in 1776 and finally to László Festetics in 1835. The mansion of the Niczky family was rebuilt by László Festetics. His son, Tasziló Festetics inherited the settlement. Berzence got market town rights first on April 10, 1758, then on September 27, 1811. According to some sources the first kindergerton of Somogy County opened in Berzence in 1867, however other sources state that it was in Bálványos in 1866.

=== Lankócz ===
Lankócz was first mentioned between 1332 and 1337 in the annual papal tithe register. It was already two separate villages: Egyházas-Lankócz and Felrét-Lankócz in 1406 which György Loránfti de Berzence got as royal gift. Both settlement belonged to György Forster de Szenterzsébet in 1481. They belonged to the Szalay family in 1726.

=== Atak ===
Atak was situated next to Lankócz and was also mentioned in the 1332-1337 papal tithe register.

=== Vecsernye-puszta ===
Vecsernye-puszta was mentioned as Vecsenye and was a possession of the Johanniter of Vrana between 1454 and 1498.

=== Szenterzsébet ===
Szenterzsébet was also mentioned in the papal register. It perished during the Turkish occupation.

=== Mindszent ===
Mindszent was also mentioned in the papal register. It also perished during the Turkish occupation.

== Main sights ==
- Festetics Mansion - built in the 18th century by the Nitzky family in Baroque style was later rebuilt between 1846 and 1848 by György Festetics in Classicist style
- Roman Catholic church - built in 1767 in Baroque style
- ruins of the Castle of Berzence
- Post Inn - built in the 18th century

== Culture ==
The Hungarian folk song Erdő, erdő, de magos a teteje was collected in Berzence in 1935 by Vilmos Seemayer.

== Famous residents ==
- Imre Jankovics (November 5, 1885 - Csurgó, 1971), Hungarian shepherd, bagpiper
- Sándor Alagovich (1760 – 1837), Hungarian ispán of Berzence, Bishop of Zagreb

== Gallery ==
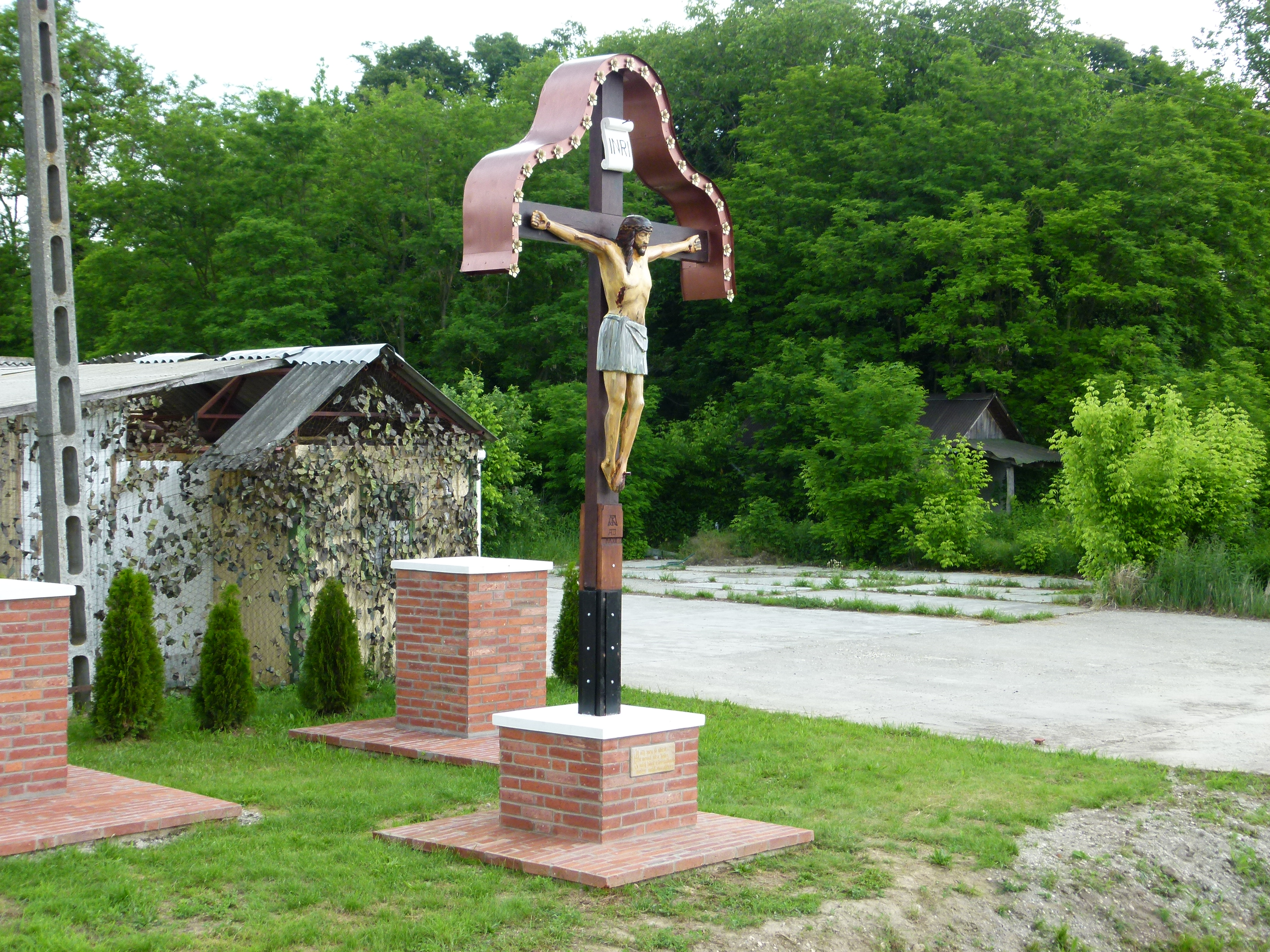
Crucifix next to the road

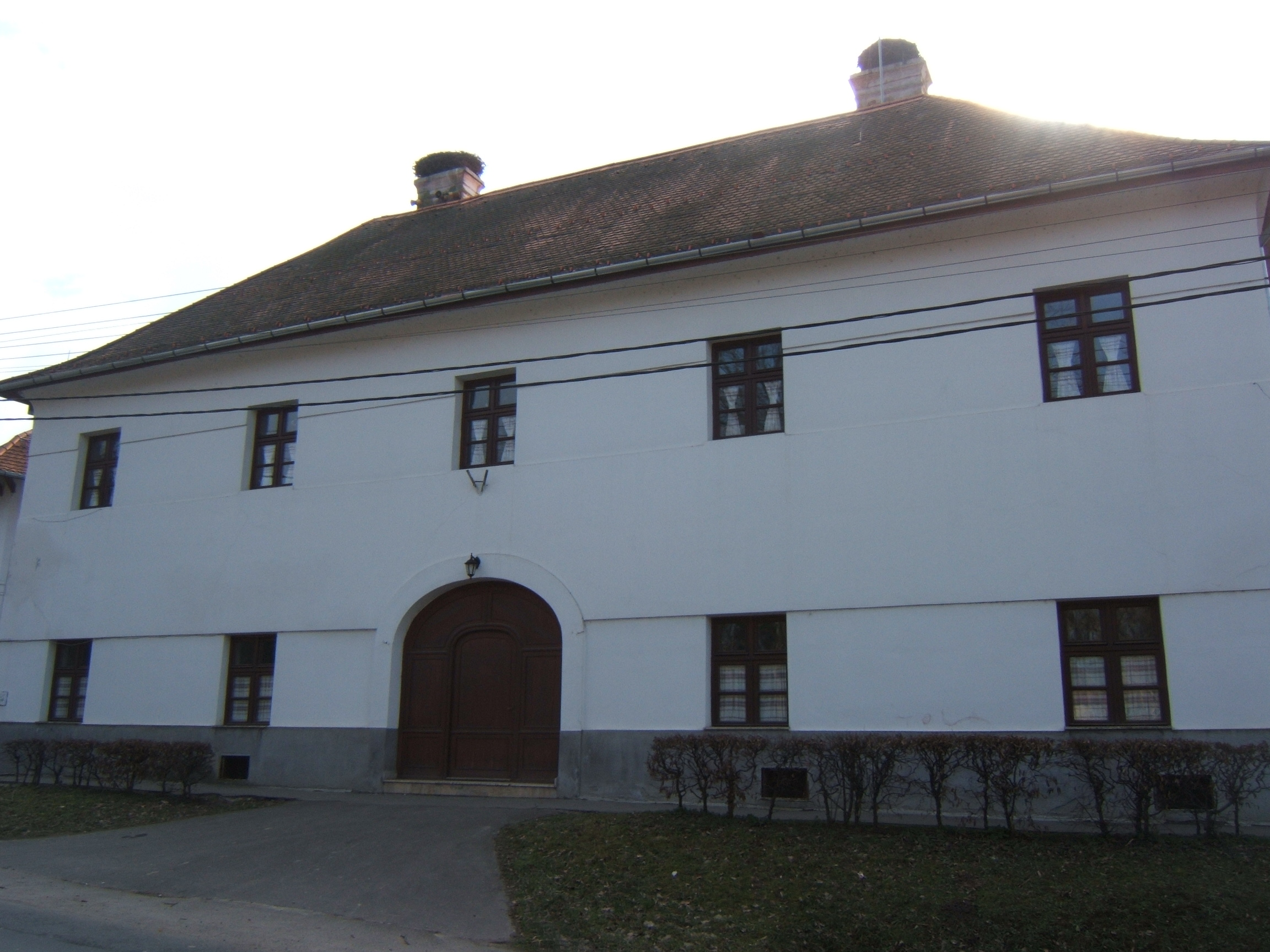
Building of the Post Inn

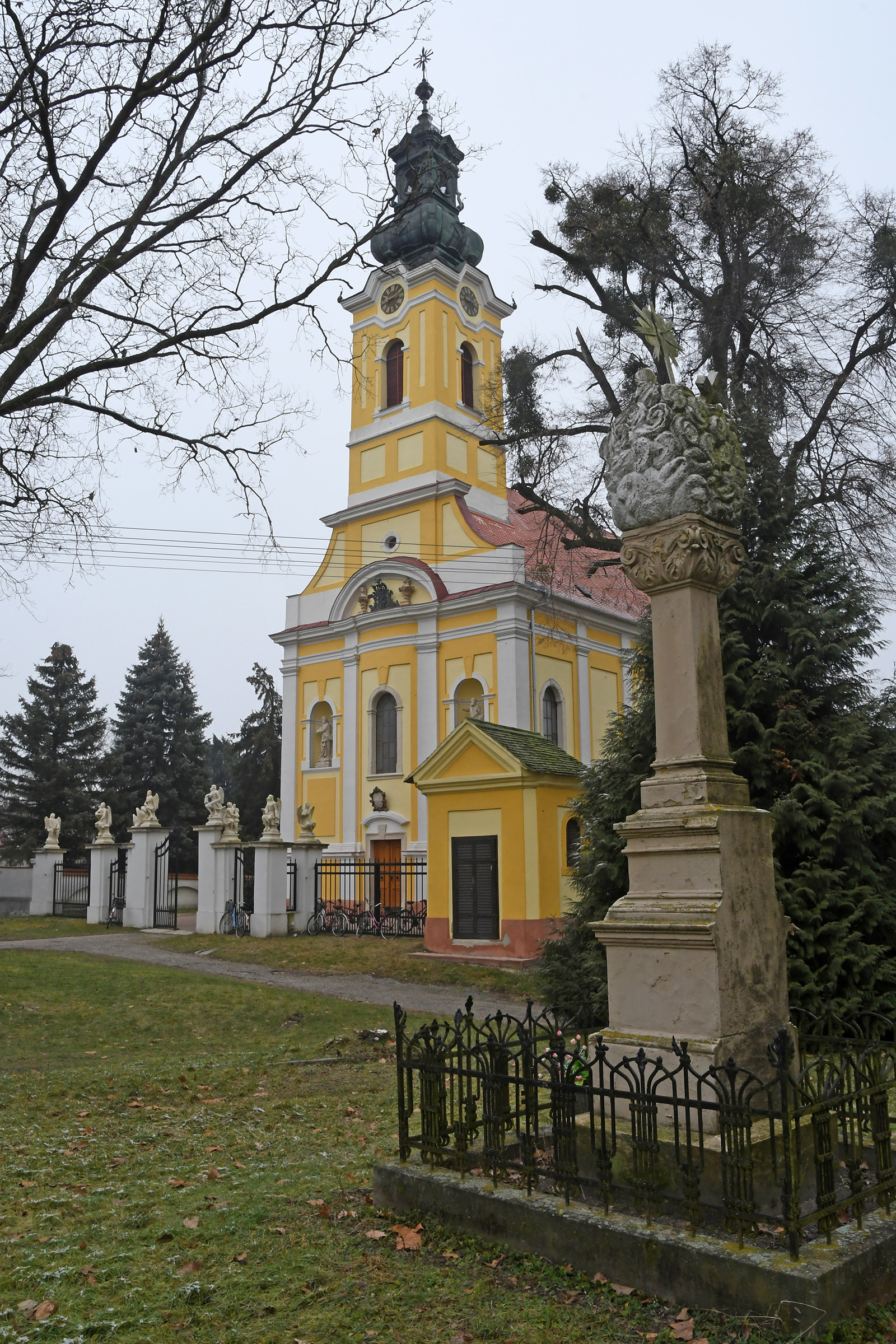
Roman Catholic church with Holy Trinity column

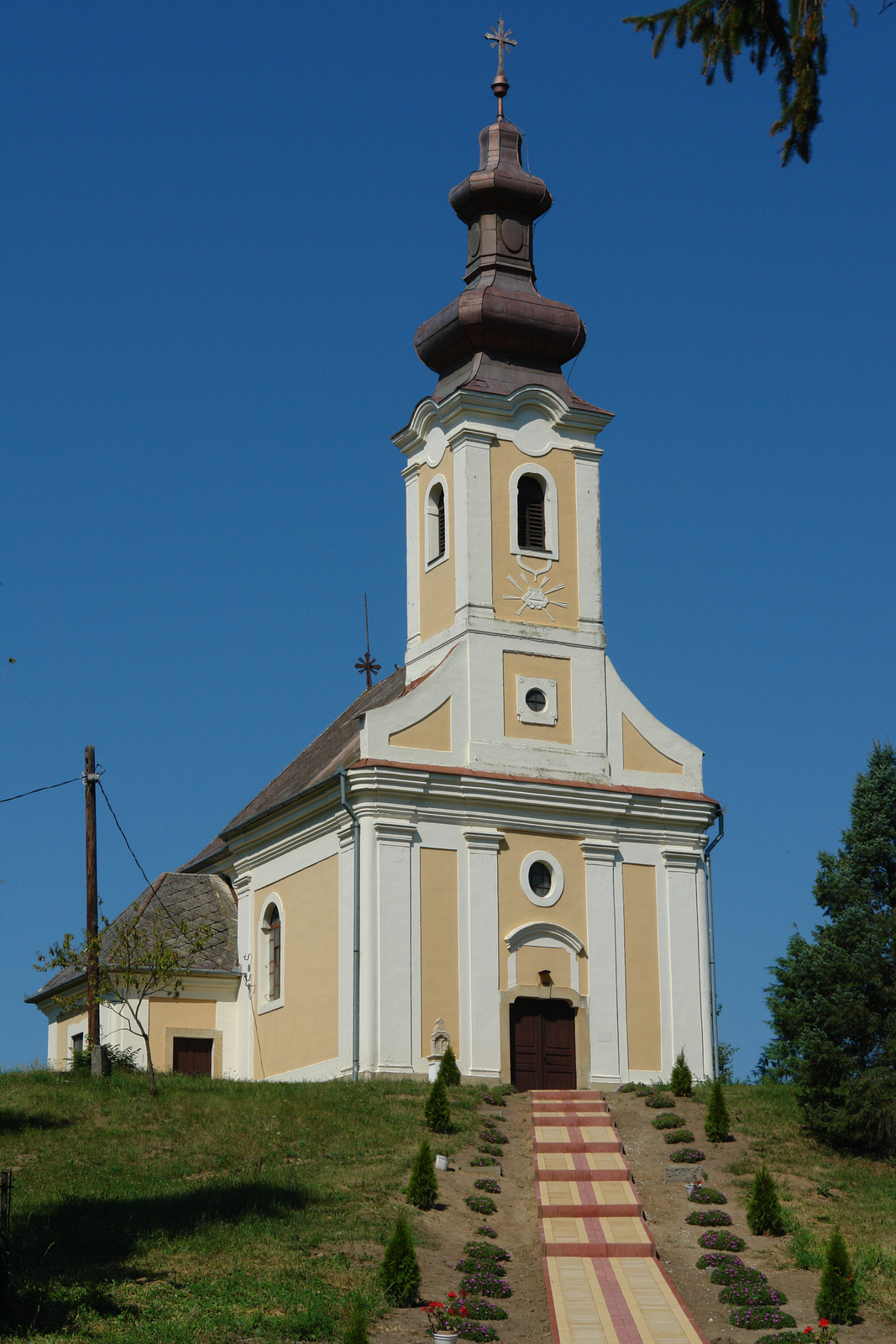
Saint Anthony chapel

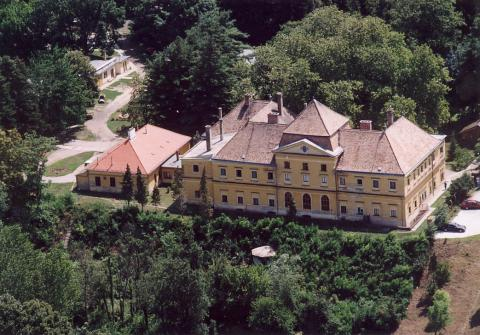
Aerial photo of the Festetics Mansion
