= Brezna =

Brezna may refer to:

== Czech Republic ==
- Březná, a river

== Serbia ==
- Brezna, Priboj
- Brezna, Kraljevo
- Brezna, Gornji Milanovac

== See also ==
- Brezno (disambiguation)
- Berezne
