= Bresnik =

Bresnik may refer to:

- Bresnik (Kraljevo), a village in Serbia
- Bresnik (Prokuplje), a village in Serbia
- Bresnik (surname)

== See also ==
- Breznik (disambiguation)
