= Karwin, West Pomeranian Voivodeship =

Karwin
- Village
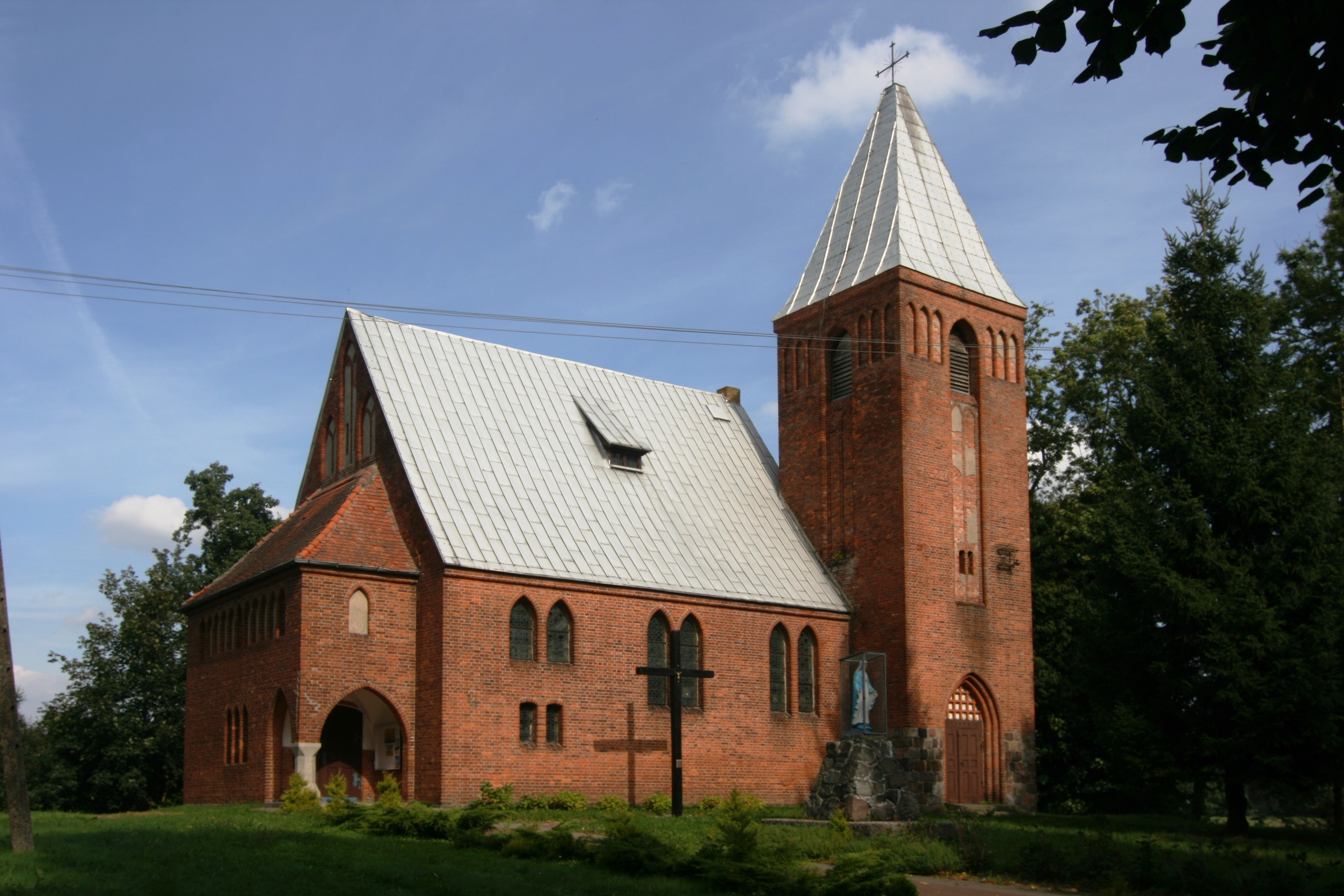
- Church of Saint Casimir in Karwin

- Location within Poland
- Coordinates: 53°59′43″N 15°45′5″E
- Country: Poland
- Voivodeship: West Pomeranian
- County: Białogard
- Gmina: Karlino
- Population: 153

Karwin [ˈkarvin] is a village in the administrative district of Gmina Karlino, within Białogard County, West Pomeranian Voivodeship, in north-western Poland. It lies approximately 10 km (6 mi) south-west of Karlino, 16 km (10 mi) west of Białogard, and 101 km (63 mi) north-east of the regional capital Szczecin.

For the history of the region, see History of Pomerania.
