= Lubiechowo-Przystanek =

- Settlement
- Location within Poland
- Coordinates: 54°3′54″N 15°50′19″E
- Country: Poland
- Voivodeship: West Pomeranian
- County: Białogard
- Gmina: Karlino
- Population: 270

Lubiechowo-Przystanek [lubjɛˈxɔvɔ pʂɨsˈtanɛk] is a settlement in the administrative district of Gmina Karlino, within Białogard County, West Pomeranian Voivodeship, in north-western Poland. It lies approximately 4 km (2 mi) north-west of Karlino, 12 km (7 mi) north-west of Białogard, and 110 km (68 mi) north-east of the regional capital Szczecin.

For the history of the region, see History of Pomerania.

The settlement has a population of 270.
