= Wietszyno =

- Village
- Location within Poland
- Coordinates: 54°4′17″N 15°44′56″E
- Country: Poland
- Voivodeship: West Pomeranian
- County: Białogard
- Gmina: Karlino
- Population: 0

Wietszyno [vjɛtˈʂɨnɔ] (German Johannesthal) is a former village in the administrative district of Gmina Karlino, within Białogard County, West Pomeranian Voivodeship, in north-western Poland. It lies approximately 10 km (6 mi) north-west of Karlino, 18 km (11 mi) north-west of Białogard, and 106 km (66 mi) north-east of the regional capital Szczecin.

For the history of the region, see History of Pomerania.
