= Lubiechowo, West Pomeranian Voivodeship =

Lubiechowo
- Village
- Location within Poland
- Coordinates: 54°4′N 15°50′E
- Country: Poland
- Voivodeship: West Pomeranian
- County: Białogard
- Gmina: Karlino
- Website: https://web.archive.org/web/20090302180216/http://karlino.home.pl/_portal/

Lubiechowo [lubjɛˈxɔvɔ] (German Lübchow) is a village in the administrative district of Gmina Karlino, within Białogard County, West Pomeranian Voivodeship, in north-western Poland. It lies approximately 5 km (3 mi) north-west of Karlino, 13 km (8 mi) north-west of Białogard, and 110 km (68 mi) north-east of the regional capital Szczecin.

For the history of the region, see History of Pomerania.
