= Ubysławice, West Pomeranian Voivodeship =

Ubysławice
- Village
- Location within Poland
- Coordinates: 54°6′N 15°55′E
- Country: Poland
- Voivodeship: West Pomeranian
- County: Białogard
- Gmina: Karlino

Ubysławice [ubɨswaˈvit͡sɛ] (German: Rüwolsdorf) is a village in the administrative district of Gmina Karlino, within Białogard County, West Pomeranian Voivodeship, in north-western Poland. It lies approximately 8 km (5 mi) north of Karlino, 12 km (7 mi) north of Białogard, and 116 km (72 mi) north-east of the regional capital Szczecin.

For the history of the region, see History of Pomerania.
