= Chotyń =

- Village
- Location within Poland
- Coordinates: 54°2′6″N 15°48′21″E
- Country: Poland
- Voivodeship: West Pomeranian
- County: Białogard
- Gmina: Karlino

Chotyń [ˈxɔtɨɲ] is a village in the administrative district of Gmina Karlino, within Białogard County, West Pomeranian Voivodeship, in north-western Poland. It lies approximately 5 km (3 mi) west of Karlino, 13 km (8 mi) west of Białogard, and 106 km (66 mi) north-east of the regional capital Szczecin.

For the history of the region, see History of Pomerania.
