= Karlino oil eruption =

Oil well eruption in Karlino, Poland

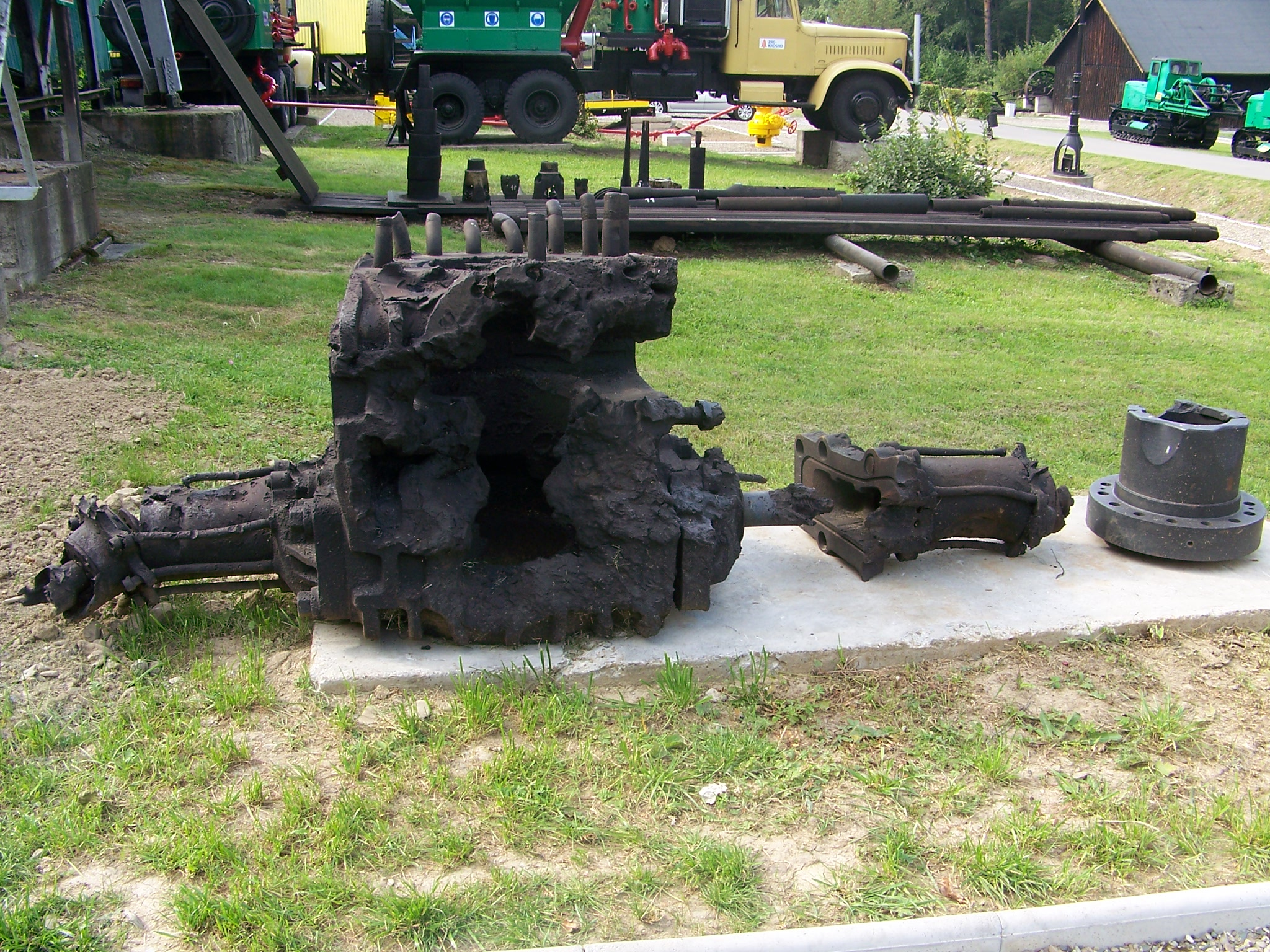
- Blowout preventer from the Daszewo - 1 drill hole, now kept at Oil Museum at Bóbrka, Krosno County
- Date: 9 December 1980 – 8 January 1981
- Location: Karlino, Poland
- Injuries: 1 soldier
- Property damage: burned 20,000–30,000 tons of oil; burned 30–50 million cubic meters of natural gas

The Karlino oil eruption was an oil well blowout that took place on 9 December 1980, near Karlino, a town located in Pomerania in northern Poland, near the Baltic Sea coast. The eruption and the fire that followed it put an end to the hope of Poland becoming a "second Kuwait". It took more than a month for Polish, Soviet and Hungarian firefighters to completely extinguish the fire. The eruption was the result of an extensive search for underground oil deposits that took place in the area in 1980.

== Background ==
In 1980, the town of Karlino became a symbol of Polish hopes for a "new Kuwait" because of the discovery of oil deposits surrounding the town. At that time Poland was in a severe economic crisis, foreign debt was mounting, and both the Communist authorities and the nation hoped to be able to sell oil from Karlino to the West and pay off the debt with the proceeds. The oil deposits took on a symbolic role as a further sign of a better future, after the election of John Paul II and the creation of Solidarity. Among disappointed officials who visited the site after the fire were First Secretary of the Communist Party Stanisław Kania and Solidarity chairman Lech Wałęsa.

== The eruption ==
At 5:30 p.m. on 9 December 1980, in a 2,800 meters deep drill hole designated Daszewo - 1, located in the village of Krzywopłoty (4.5 kilometers from Karlino), a giant eruption of oil and natural gas took place. Soon afterwards, a fire broke out, with flames reaching up to 130 meters. The temperature of the burning mix of gas and oil reached 900 °C, and in spite of sub-zero temperatures, leaves appeared on frozen trees nearby. During the night of 9/10 December, four workers were burned and had to be taken to hospital in Białogard. Eighteen teams of firefighters arrived at the site, and nearby households were evacuated. The Szczecin-bound lanes of the main East - West National Route Number 6 (Droga Krajowa nr 6) adjacent to the fire were closed. Workers' equipment and shacks were destroyed. Oil pressure reached 560 atmospheres, and the fire was visible from several kilometers away. At that time, it was one of the biggest oil eruptions in the history of Europe.

== Extinguishing operation ==
On 11 December, specialized units of the Polish Army, firefighters, police, a mining search and rescue unit from Kraków, and specialists from Kraków's AGH University of Science and Technology began working on protecting the local area from the flames. News of the fire was front-page news throughout Poland, with headlines such as "Days hot like oil", "Karlino without a Christmas break", "Karlino's torch", and "Artillery and sappers in Karlino". Five days later, on 16 December, firefighters from Hungary and the Soviet Union joined the Poles, and command of the operation was taken by engineer Adam Kilar and Soviet expert Leon Kalyna from Poltava, who himself was of Polish ancestry. By 18 December, the area adjacent to the drill hole was cleared of burned and destroyed steel parts of the oil well and a road had been constructed to the locations of two new wells.

The operation to extinguish the fire was very elaborate and preparation lasted almost a month, until January 2, 1981. A special pipeline was constructed, and the population of Poland was vividly interested in these events. Every day, hundreds of letters came to Karlino with suggestions on how to put the fire out. After long consideration, the specialists came up with the following solution. First, remnants of the destroyed oil well and blowout preventer were removed. The well was removed by a specially constructed tractor, equipped with a 30-m hook arm. The preventer, however, was destroyed by a cannon from a distance of 25 m. The task was to aim at a small crack between the flanges. First an 85 mm cannon was used, then a 122 mm howitzer, and finally on 28 December, a 152 mm cannon-howitzer managed to destroy the preventer. After all the preparations, the fire was extinguished on 8 January 1981, almost a month after the eruption. The local Karlino Chronicle wrote: "At 10:42 a.m. a stream of water from 23 cannons was aimed at the burning geyser of oil. After 16 minutes, the fire went out, and specialists removed the damaged flanges".

On 10 January 1981, at 3:38 p.m., a new preventer was installed, and the stream of oil was stopped. That was the end of the operation, after 32 days. Altogether, some 1000 people were involved in the mission. The new preventer was constructed at May 1 Works in Ploiești, Romania. It weighed 11 tons, and was lifted by a 100-ton crane with a 60-meter arm. The entire operation cost about 300 million zlotys, and during the fire, some 20,000–30,000 tons of oil and some 30–50 million cubic meters of natural gas burned. There was one injury in the extinguishing operation: a soldier was slightly burned.

== Aftermath ==
The investigation established that the primary cause of the eruption was looseness in the blowout preventer. Most likely, gaskets were damaged and the preventer was not locked in time. The fire was caused by gasoline engines driving the pumps. Another reason of the eruption was an inaccurate geologic assessment: specialists had expected to encounter oil at a depth of 2,952 m underground, but it turned out to be at 2,792 meters, 160 m higher than expected.

On 16 January 1981, at 3:55 p.m., a cargo train with seventeen tank cars filled with oil left Karlino rail station, heading towards a refinery in Trzebinia. Hopes were high, but it turned out that the oil deposits were sparse, and after a few years, the well ran dry. Altogether, more than 850 tons of oil were extracted and transported to Trzebinia—much less than expected. As experts later stated, if the fire had lasted for two more weeks, all the oil would have burned out. Also, the Karlino oil was assessed as of "average quality", with 0.58% sulphur content.

Since October 2002, the Daszewo - 1 drill hole has been used for natural gas production. The drill hole currently serves as an underground natural gas storage facility, with a capacity of 30 million cubic metres. In December 2010, the mayor of Karlino announced plans for the opening of an interactive museum dedicated to the 1980 eruption.

== See also ==
- Oil well fire
- Kuwaiti oil fires
- Romania oil fires
