= Domacyno =

- Village
- Location within Poland
- Coordinates: 53°58′N 15°45′E
- Country: Poland
- Voivodeship: West Pomeranian
- County: Białogard
- Gmina: Karlino

Domacyno [dɔmaˈt͡sɨnɔ] is a village in the administrative district of Gmina Karlino, within Białogard County, West Pomeranian Voivodeship, in north-western Poland. It lies approximately 12 km (7 mi) south-west of Karlino, 16 km (10 mi) west of Białogard, and 99 km (62 mi) north-east of the regional capital Szczecin.

For the history of the region, see History of Pomerania.
