= Gościnko =

- Village
- Location within Poland
- Coordinates: 53°59′N 15°44′E
- Country: Poland
- Voivodeship: West Pomeranian
- County: Białogard
- Gmina: Karlino

Gościnko (Polish pronunciation: [ɡɔɕˈt͡ɕinkɔ]) (German: Klein Jestin) is a village in the administrative district of Gmina Karlino, within Białogard County, West Pomeranian Voivodeship, in north-western Poland. It lies approximately 12 km (7 mi) south-west of Karlino, 17 km (11 mi) west of Białogard, and 99 km (62 mi) north-east of the regional capital Szczecin.

For the history of the region, see History of Pomerania.
