= Malonowo =

- Village
- Location within Poland
- Coordinates: 54°0′28″N 15°47′41″E
- Country: Poland
- Voivodeship: West Pomeranian
- County: Białogard
- Gmina: Karlino
- Time zone: UTC+01:00 (CET)
  - Summer (DST): UTC+02:00 (CEST)

Malonowo [malɔˈnɔvɔ] (German: Mallnow) is a village in the administrative district of Gmina Karlino, within Białogard County, West Pomeranian Voivodeship, in north-western Poland. It lies approximately 7 km (4 mi) south-west of Karlino, 13 km (8 mi) west of Białogard, and 104 km (65 mi) north-east of the regional capital Szczecin.

For the history of the region, see History of Pomerania.
