= Zwartowo =

Zwartowo may refer to the following places:

- Zwartowo, Pomeranian Voivodeship (north Poland)
- Zwartowo, Białogard County in West Pomeranian Voivodeship (north-west Poland)
- Zwartowo, Szczecinek County in West Pomeranian Voivodeship (north-west Poland)
