= Czerwięcino =

- Village
- Location within Poland
- Coordinates: 54°3′58″N 15°48′13″E
- Country: Poland
- Voivodeship: West Pomeranian
- County: Białogard
- Gmina: Karlino
- Population: 20

Czerwięcino [t͡ʂɛrvjɛnˈt͡ɕinɔ] is a village in the administrative district of Gmina Karlino, within Białogard County, West Pomeranian Voivodeship, in north-western Poland. It lies approximately 6 km (4 mi) north-west of Karlino, 14 km (9 mi) north-west of Białogard, and 108 km (67 mi) north-east of the regional capital Szczecin.

For the history of the region, see History of Pomerania.

The village has a population of 20.
