= Březnice =

Březnice may refer to places in the Czech Republic:

- Březnice (Příbram District), a town in the Central Bohemian Region
- Březnice (Tábor District), a municipality and village in the South Bohemian Region
- Březnice (Zlín District), a municipality and village in the Zlín Region

== See also ==
- Breznica (disambiguation)
- Breznița (disambiguation)
