= Kowańcz =

- Village
- Location within Poland
- Coordinates: 54°2′5″N 15°50′15″E
- Country: Poland
- Voivodeship: West Pomeranian
- County: Białogard
- Gmina: Karlino

Kowańcz [ˈkɔvaɲt͡ʂ] (German: Kowanz) is a village in the administrative district of Gmina Karlino, within Białogard County, West Pomeranian Voivodeship, in north-western Poland. It lies approximately 3 km (2 mi) west of Karlino, 11 km (7 mi) west of Białogard, and 108 km (67 mi) north-east of the regional capital Szczecin.

For the history of the region, see History of Pomerania.
