= Wyganów, West Pomeranian Voivodeship =

Wyganów
- Village
- Location within Poland
- Coordinates: 54°8′2″N 15°53′28″E
- Country: Poland
- Voivodeship: West Pomeranian
- County: Białogard
- Gmina: Karlino

Wyganów [vɨˈɡanuf] is a village in the administrative district of Gmina Karlino, within Białogard County, West Pomeranian Voivodeship, in north-western Poland. It lies approximately 11 km (7 mi) north of Karlino, 17 km (11 mi) north of Białogard, and 118 km (73 mi) north-east of the regional capital Szczecin.

For the history of the region, see History of Pomerania.
