= Mierzyn, Białogard County =

Mierzyn
- Village
- Location within Poland
- Coordinates: 54°6′45″N 15°53′10″E
- Country: Poland
- Voivodeship: West Pomeranian
- County: Białogard
- Gmina: Karlino

Mierzyn [ˈmjɛʐɨn] is a village in the administrative district of Gmina Karlino, within Białogard County, West Pomeranian Voivodeship, in north-western Poland. It lies approximately 9 km (6 mi) north of Karlino, 15 km (9 mi) north-west of Białogard, and 116 km (72 mi) north-east of the regional capital Szczecin.

For the history of the region, see History of Pomerania.
