= Pobłocie Wielkie =

- Village
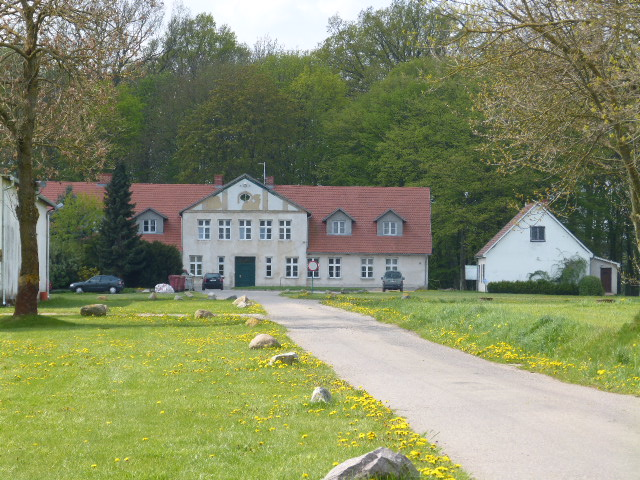
- Manor in the village

- Location within Poland
- Coordinates: 54°2′47″N 15°45′28″E
- Country: Poland
- Voivodeship: West Pomeranian
- County: Białogard
- Gmina: Karlino

Pobłocie Wielkie [pɔˈbwɔt͡ɕɛ ˈvjɛlkʲɛ] (German: Groß Pobloth) is a village in the administrative district of Gmina Karlino, within Białogard County, West Pomeranian Voivodeship, in north-western Poland. It lies approximately 8 km (5 mi) west of Karlino, 16 km (10 mi) west of Białogard, and 105 km (65 mi) north-east of the regional capital Szczecin.

For the history of the region, see History of Pomerania.
