= Mierzynek, West Pomeranian Voivodeship =

Mierzynek
- Village
- Location within Poland
- Coordinates: 54°8′0″N 15°53′30″E
- Country: Poland
- Voivodeship: West Pomeranian
- County: Białogard
- Gmina: Karlino
- Time zone: UTC+01:00 (CET)
  - Summer (DST): UTC+02:00 (CEST)

Mierzynek [mjɛˈʐɨnɛk] is a village in the administrative district of Gmina Karlino, within Białogard County, West Pomeranian Voivodeship, in north-western Poland. It lies approximately 11 km (7 mi) north of Karlino, 16 km (10 mi) north of Białogard, and 118 km (73 mi) north-east of the regional capital Szczecin.

For the history of the region, see History of Pomerania.
