= Garnki =

- Village
- Location within Poland
- Coordinates: 53°59′N 15°49′E
- Country: Poland
- Voivodeship: West Pomeranian
- County: Białogard
- Gmina: Karlino

Garnki [ˈɡarnki] (German: Garchen) is a village in the administrative district of Gmina Karlino, within Białogard County, West Pomeranian Voivodeship, in north-western Poland. It lies approximately 8 km (5 mi) south-west of Karlino, 12 km (7 mi) west of Białogard, and 103 km (64 mi) north-east of the regional capital Szczecin.

For the history of the region, see History of Pomerania.
