= Gmina Karlino =

Gmina Karlino Karlino Commune
- Gmina
- Flag Coat of arms
- Interactive map of Gmina Karlino
- Coordinates (Karlino): 54°2′21″N 15°52′43″E
- Country: Poland
- Voivodeship: West Pomeranian
- County: Białogard
- Seat: Karlino

Area
  - Total: 141.02 km^{2} (54.45 sq mi)

Population (2006)
  - Total: 9,168
  - Density: 65.01/km^{2} (168.4/sq mi)
  - Urban: 5,794
  - Rural: 3,374
- Website: http://www.karlino.home.pl/

Gmina Karlino is an urban-rural gmina (administrative district) in Białogard County, West Pomeranian Voivodeship, in north-western Poland. Its seat is the town of Karlino, which lies approximately 9 kilometres (6 mi) north-west of Białogard and 110 km (68 mi) north-east of the regional capital Szczecin.

The gmina covers an area of 141.02 square kilometres (54.4 sq mi), and as of 2006 its total population is 9,168 (out of which the population of Karlino amounts to 5,794, and the population of the rural part of the gmina is 3,374).

== Villages ==
Apart from the town of Karlino, Gmina Karlino contains the villages and settlements of Brzeźno, Chotyń, Czerwięcino, Daszewo, Dębolas, Domacyno, Garnki, Gościnko, Karlinko, Karścino, Karwin, Kowańcz, Krzywopłoty, Lubiechowo, Lubiechowo-Przystanek, Malonowo, Mierzyn, Mierzynek, Pobłocie Wielkie, Ubysławice, Wietszyno, Witolub, Wyganów and Zwartowo.

== Neighbouring gminas ==
Gmina Karlino is bordered by the gminas of Będzino, Białogard, Biesiekierz, Dygowo, Gościno and Sławoborze.
