= Andrijevac =

Settlement in Osijek-Baranja County, Croatia

- settlement
- Interactive map of Andrijevac
- Location within Croatia
- Coordinates: 45°30′50″N 18°15′39″E
- Country: Croatia
- County: Osijek-Baranja
- Municipality: Koška

Area
  - Total: 8.3 km^{2} (3.2 sq mi)

Population (2021)
  - Total: 88
  - Density: 11/km^{2} (27/sq mi)
- Time zone: UTC+1 (CET)
  - Summer (DST): UTC+2 (CEST)
- Postal code: 31500 Našice
- Area code: +385 (0)31

Andrijevac is a settlement in the Municipality of Koška in Croatia. In 2021, its population was 88.

== Demographics ==
Andrijevac: Population trends 1857–2021
v

population			29	60	74	19	41	439	482	562	532	527	353	331	191	155	88
	1857	1869	1880	1890	1900	1910	1921	1931	1948	1953	1961	1971	1981	1991	2001	2011	2021

Sources: Croatian Bureau of Statistics publications
