= Lončar =

Lončar (pronounced [lǒntʃaːr]) is a Serbian, Montenegrin, Croatian and Slovenian surname, meaning "potter".

It is among the most common surnames in the Koprivnica-Križevci County of Croatia.

It may refer to:

- Alen Lončar (born 1974), Croatian swimmer
- Beba Lončar (born 1943), Serbian-Italian film actress
- Budimir Lončar (1924–2024), Croatian diplomat and Yugoslav politician
- Dragotin Lončar (1876–1954), Slovenian historian, editor and politician
- Krešimir Lončar (born 1983), Croatian basketball player
- Nikola Lončar (born 1972), Serbian basketball player
- Rade Lončar (born 1996), Serbian basketball player
- Stefan Lončar (born 1996), Montenegrin footballer
- Stjepan Lončar (born 1996), Bosnian-Herzegovinian footballer
- Zlatibor Lončar (born 1971), Serbian politician
- Zoran Lončar (born 1965), Serbian politician
- Zoran Lončar (footballer) (born 1966), Serbian footballer
