= Bresnik (surname) =

Bresnik, or Bresnick, is a surname. Notable people include:

- Günter Bresnik (born 1961), Austrian tennis coach
- Martin Bresnick (born 1946), American composer
- Randolph Bresnik (born 1967), American astronaut

== See also ==
- Breznik (surname)
