= Topoline =

- Village (Selo)
- Location within Osijek-Baranja County Location within Croatia
- Country: Croatia
- County: Osijek-Baranja County
- Municipality: Koška

Area
  - Total: 1.4 km^{2} (0.54 sq mi)

Population (2021)
  - Total: 121
  - Density: 86/km^{2} (220/sq mi)
- Time zone: UTC+1 (CET)
  - Summer (DST): UTC+2 (CEST)

Topoline is a village in Croatia. It is connected by the D2 highway.

== Name ==
The name of the village in Croatian is plural.
