= Zwartowo, Białogard County =

Zwartowo
- Village
- Location within Poland
- Coordinates: 53°58′N 15°48′E
- Country: Poland
- Voivodeship: West Pomeranian
- County: Białogard
- Gmina: Karlino

Zwartowo [zvarˈtɔvɔ] is a village in the administrative district of Gmina Karlino, within Białogard County, West Pomeranian Voivodeship, in north-western Poland. It lies approximately 10 km (6 mi) south-west of Karlino, 13 km (8 mi) west of Białogard, and 101 km (63 mi) north-east of the regional capital Szczecin.

For the history of the region, see History of Pomerania.
