= Normanci =

- Village (Selo)
- Location within Osijek-Baranja County Location within Croatia Location within Europe
- Country: Croatia
- County: Osijek-Baranja County
- Municipality: Koška

Area
  - Total: 10.9 km^{2} (4.2 sq mi)

Population (2021)
  - Total: 269
  - Density: 24.7/km^{2} (63.9/sq mi)
- Time zone: UTC+1 (CET)
  - Summer (DST): UTC+2 (CEST)

Normanci is a village in Croatia. It is connected by the D2 highway.

== Name ==
The name of the village in Croatian is plural. Until 1991 the village name was Vučkovac.
