= Breznik (disambiguation) =

Breznik may refer to:

== Places ==
Bulgaria

- Breznik, a town in western Bulgaria

Czech Republic

- Březník, a municipality in Třebíč District, Czech Republic

Slovenia

- Breznik, Črnomelj, a village in the Municipality of Črnomelj, southeastern Slovenia
- Breznik, Zagorje ob Savi, a village in the Municipality of Zagorje ob Savi, central Slovenia

== Other ==
- Breznik (surname)
