= Krzywopłoty, West Pomeranian Voivodeship =

Krzywopłoty
- Village
- Location within Poland
- Coordinates: 54°3′27″N 15°55′52″E
- Country: Poland
- Voivodeship: West Pomeranian
- County: Białogard
- Gmina: Karlino

Krzywopłoty [kʂɨvɔˈpwɔtɨ] is a village in the administrative district of Gmina Karlino, within Białogard County, West Pomeranian Voivodeship, in north-western Poland. It lies approximately 4 km (2 mi) north-east of Karlino, 8 km (5 mi) north-west of Białogard, and 114 km (71 mi) north-east of the regional capital Szczecin.

For the history of the region, see History of Pomerania.
