= Koška =

- Municipality
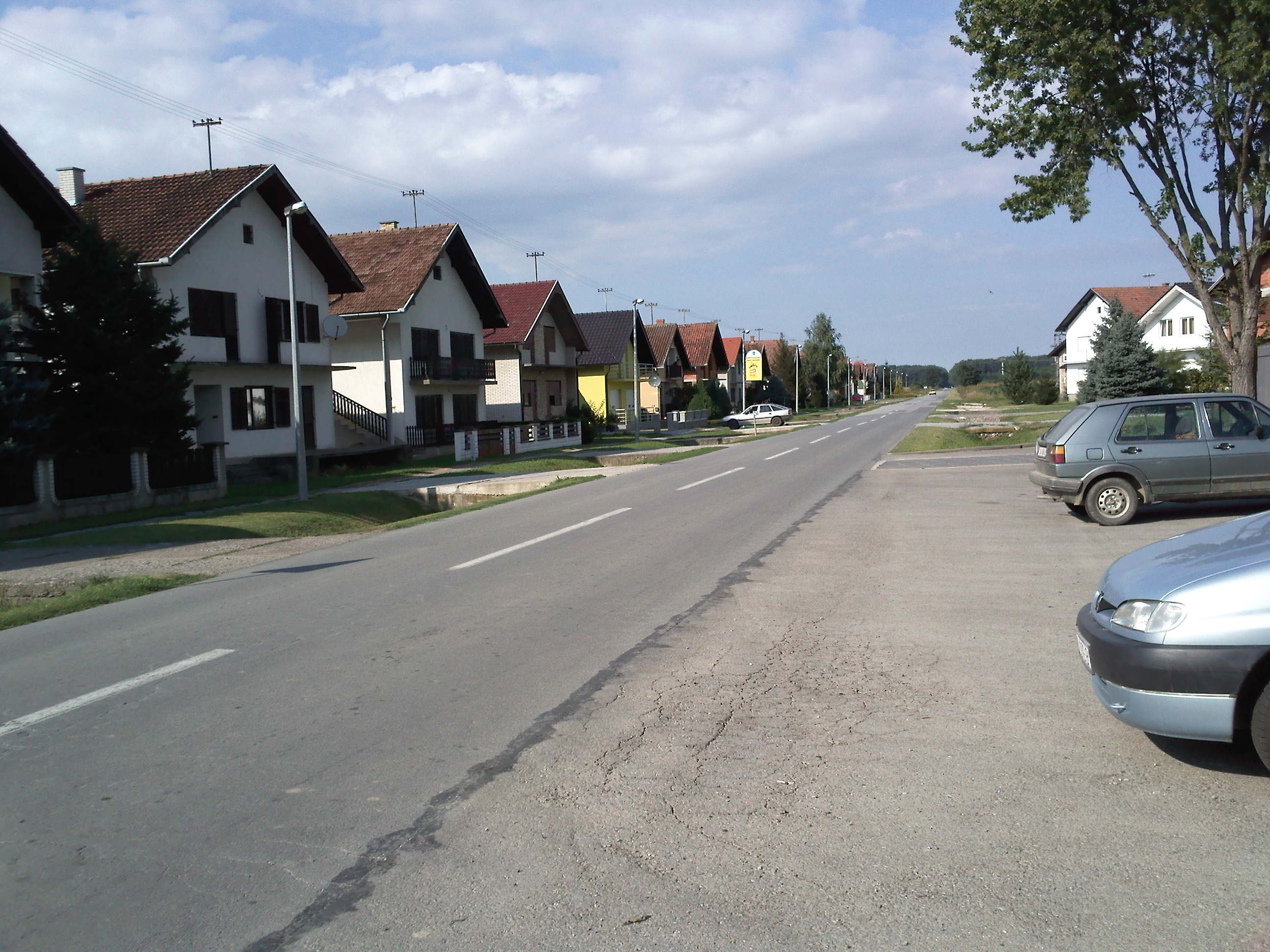

- Flag Coat of arms

- Location in Croatia Koška (Croatia)
- Coordinates: 45.54°N 18.28°E
- Country: Croatia
- Region: Slavonia
- County: Osijek-Baranja County

Government
  - Mayor: Zoran Kovačević

Area
  - Municipality: 122.6 km^{2} (47.3 sq mi)
  - Urban: 37.9 km^{2} (14.6 sq mi)

Population (2021)
  - Municipality: 3,169
  - Density: 25.85/km^{2} (66.95/sq mi)
  - Urban: 1,237
  - Urban density: 32.6/km^{2} (84.5/sq mi)
- Time zone: UTC+1 (Central European Time)
- Website: koska.hr

Koška (Serbian Cyrillic: Кошка, Slovak: Koška, Hungarian: Koska) is a municipality in Osijek-Baranja County, Croatia. There are 3,980 inhabitants, 89.5% of them Croats, 6.78% Serbs and 1.38% Slovaks (2011 census).

The settlements in the municipality are:

- Andrijevac, population 155
- Branimirovac, population 95
- Breznica Našička, population 617
- Koška, population 1,525
- Ledenik, population 189
- Lug Subotički, population 335
- Niza, population 432
- Normanci, population 324
- Ordanja, population 162
- Topoline, population 146

== Politics ==
=== Minority councils ===
Directly elected minority councils and representatives are tasked with consulting the local or regional authorities, advocating for minority rights and interests, integration into public life and participation in the management of local affairs. At the 2023 Croatian national minorities councils and representatives elections Serbs of Croatia fulfilled legal requirements to elect 10 members municipal minority councils of the Koška Municipality.
