= Daszewo =

Daszewo Dassow
- Village
- Location within Poland
- Coordinates: 54°05′N 15°53′E
- Country: Poland
- Voivodeship: West Pomeranian
- Powiat: Białogard, Białogard County
- Gmina: Karlino
- Elevation: 11 m (36 ft)

Population (2005)
  - Total: 94
- Time zone: UTC+1 (CET)
  - Summer (DST): UTC+2 (CEST)
- Car Plates: ZBI

Daszewo [daˈʂɛvɔ] (German: Dassow) is a village in Poland. It is located in Białogard County, West Pomeranian Voivodeship in northwestern Poland.

Daszewo is the subject of the documentary film "Deutsch-Polnische Annäherungen in Daszewo" ("German-Polish Reconciliation in Daszewo"). The film compares life memories of German and Polish residents from Daszewo with the hope for better German-Polish cooperation. There is a German and a Polish version of the film.

== Geography ==
Daszewo is approximately 320 km (199 mi) from Dassow, Germany.

=== Neighboring municipalities ===
In a clockwise direction, beginning in the north, the following cities and municipalities border on Daszewo: Skoczow, Mierzyn, Mierzynek, Ubyslawice, Swiemino, Karlinko, Krzywoploty, Redlino, Karlino, Lulewice, Lubiechowo, and Syrkowice.
