= Breznița =

Brezniţa may refer to one of two communes in Mehedinți County, Romania:

- Breznița-Ocol
- Breznița-Motru

== See also ==
- Breznica (disambiguation)
- Březnice (disambiguation)
