= Niza, Croatia =

Niza
- Village (Selo)

- Location within Osijek-Baranja County Location within Croatia Location within Europe
- Country: Croatia
- County: Osijek-Baranja
- Municipality: Koška

Area
  - Total: 16.5 km^{2} (6.4 sq mi)
- Elevation: 95 m (312 ft)

Population (2021)
  - Total: 361
  - Density: 21.9/km^{2} (56.7/sq mi)
- Time zone: UTC+1 (CET)
  - Summer (DST): UTC+2 (CEST)
- Postal code: 31224
- Area code: 031
- Website: www.koska.hr

Niza is a village in Croatia. It is connected by the D2 highway.
