= Brzezno (disambiguation) =

Brzeżno is a village in Świdwin County, West Pomeranian Voivodeship, Poland.

Brzezno may also refer to:

In Greater Poland Voivodeship (west-central Poland):

- Brzezno, Greater Poland Voivodeship
- Brzeźno, Czarnków-Trzcianka County
- Brzeźno, Konin County
- Brzeźno, Poznań County
- Brzeźno, Wągrowiec County

In Kuyavian-Pomeranian Voivodeship (north-central Poland):

- Brzeźno, Aleksandrów County
- Brzeźno, Lipno County
- Brzeźno, Świecie County
- Brzeźno, Toruń County
- Brzeźno, Tuchola County

In Lubusz Voivodeship (west Poland):

- Brzeźno, Gorzów County
- Brzeźno, Międzyrzecz County
- Brzeźno, Sulęcin County

In Pomeranian Voivodeship (north Poland):

- Brzeźno, a district of Gdańsk
- Brzeźno, Człuchów County
- Brzeźno, Tczew County

In West Pomeranian Voivodeship (north-west Poland):

- Brzeźno, Białogard County
- Brzeźno, Gmina Barwice
- Brzeźno, Gmina Szczecinek

In other voivodeships:

- Brzeźno, Lower Silesian Voivodeship (south-west Poland)
- Brzeźno, Lublin Voivodeship (east Poland)
- Brzeźno, Masovian Voivodeship (east-central Poland)
- Brzeźno, Podlaskie Voivodeship (north-east Poland)
- Brzeźno, Świętokrzyskie Voivodeship (south-central Poland)
- Brzeźno, Warmian-Masurian Voivodeship (north Poland)

== See also ==
- Brzeżno Łyńskie, Warmian-Masurian Voivodeship
