= Rade Lončar =

Serbian basketball player

Personal information
- Born: December 6, 1996 (age 29) Belgrade, Serbia, FR Yugoslavia
- Listed height: 6 ft 9 in (2.06 m)

Career information
- NBA draft: 2018: undrafted
- Playing career: 2014–present
- Position: Power forward

Career history
- 2014–2015: Železničar Inđija
- 2015–2016: Vojvodina Srbijagas

Rade Lončar (Serbian Cyrillic: Раде Лончар; born December 6, 1996) is a Serbian professional basketball player. Standing at 6 ft 9 in (2.06 m), he plays at the power forward position.

== Professional career ==
Lončar started his senior career in 2014 with Železničar Inđija.

He was in Vojvodina Srbijagas roster during the 2015–16 season.
