= Breznica =

Breznica (Serbian: Брезница) may refer to:

Croatia

- Breznica, Croatia, a village and municipality in Varaždin county
- Breznica Đakovačka, a village near Đakovo
- Breznica Našička, a village near Našice

Serbia

- Breznica (Bujanovac), a village
- Breznica (Žagubica), a village

Slovakia

- Breznica, Stropkov District, Prešov Region

Slovenia

- Breznica pod Lubnikom, a village in the Municipality of Škofja Loka
- Breznica pri Žireh, a village in the Municipality of Žiri
- Breznica, Prevalje, a village in the Municipality of Prevalje
- Breznica, Žirovnica, a village in the Municipality of Žirovnica

== See also ==
- Breznička (disambiguation)
