= Brezna (Gornji Milanovac) =

Brezna Брезна
- Village
- Location within Serbia
- Coordinates: 44°03′N 20°18′E
- Country: Serbia
- District: Moravica District
- Municipality: Gornji Milanovac

Population (2002)
  - Total: 209
- Time zone: UTC+1 (CET)
  - Summer (DST): UTC+2 (CEST)

Brezna is a village in the municipality of Gornji Milanovac, Serbia. According to the 2002 census, the village has a population of 209 people.

The village was active in the Serbian Revolution, being organized into the knežina (administrative unit) of Brusnica (Takovo) during the First Serbian Uprising (1804–13). Among notable local revolutionaries were: knez Radovan Tomašević; Vasilj Milojević; Lazar Vasiljević; Milić Brajović.
