= Breznička =

Breznička may refer to several places in Slovakia.

- Breznička, Poltár District
- Breznička, Stropkov District
