= Březnice (Zlín District) =

- Municipality
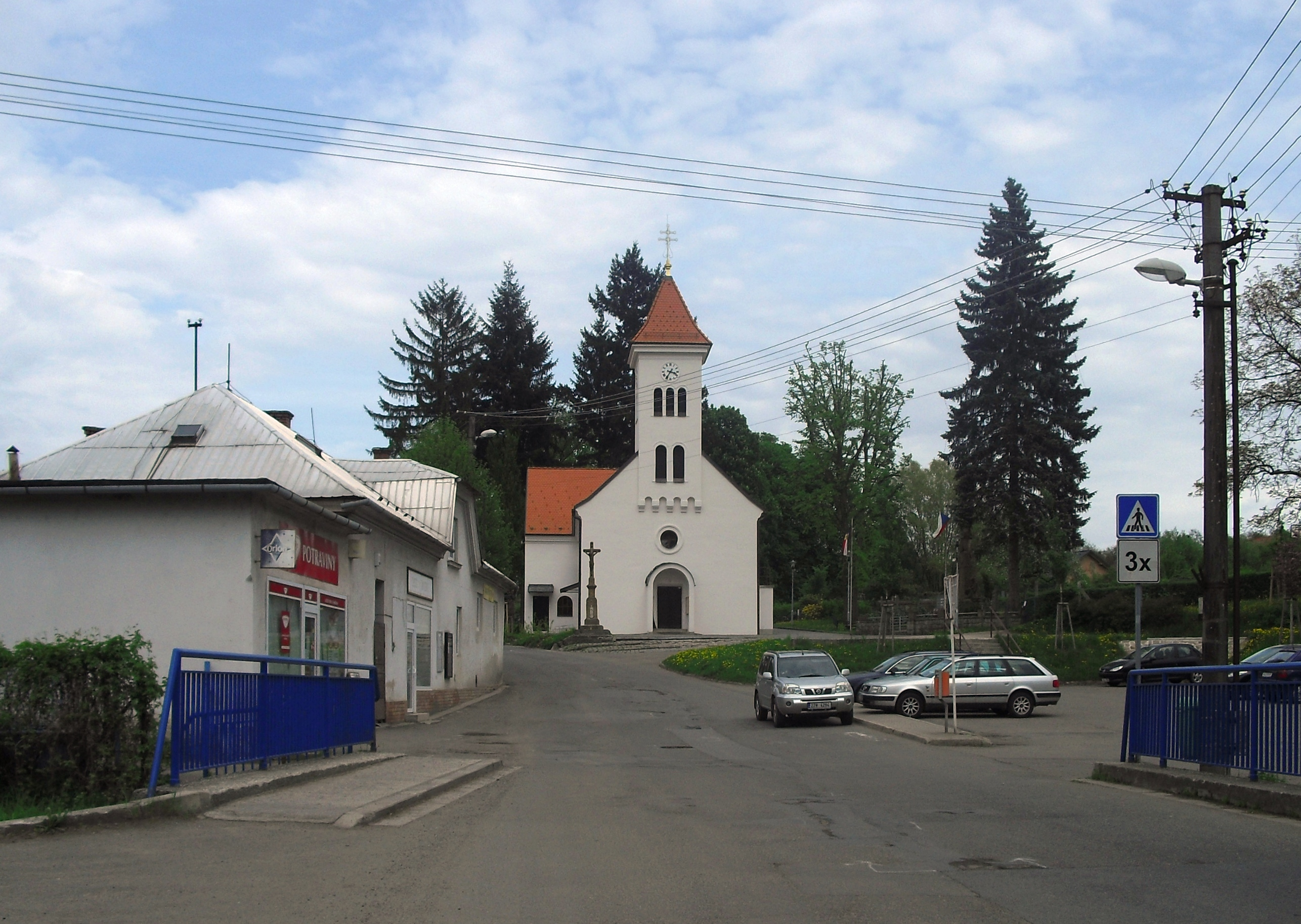
- Centre of Březnice with the Church of Saint Bartholomew

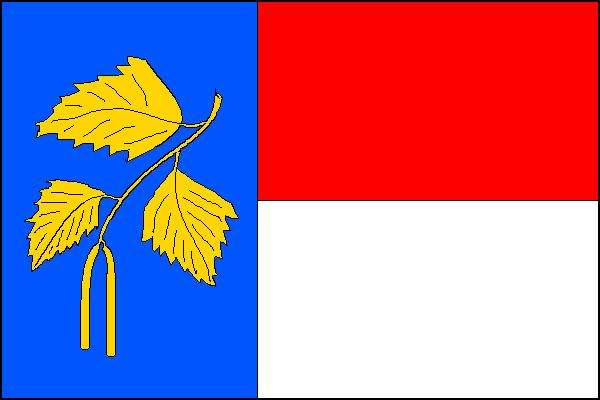
- Flag Coat of arms

- Location in the Czech Republic
- Coordinates: 49°11′11″N 17°39′46″E
- Country: Czech Republic
- Region: Zlín
- District: Zlín
- First mentioned: 1397

Area
  - Total: 9.15 km^{2} (3.53 sq mi)
- Elevation: 294 m (965 ft)

Population (2026-01-01)
  - Total: 1,470
  - Density: 161/km^{2} (416/sq mi)
- Time zone: UTC+1 (CET)
  - Summer (DST): UTC+2 (CEST)
- Postal code: 760 01
- Website: www.breznice-zlin.cz

Březnice is a municipality and village in Zlín District in the Zlín Region of the Czech Republic. It has about 1,500 inhabitants.

Březnice lies approximately 6 kilometres (4 mi) south of Zlín and 254 km (158 mi) south-east of Prague.

== Demographics ==
Historical population
Year	Pop.	±%
1869	814	—
1880	843	+3.6%
1890	849	+0.7%
1900	986	+16.1%
1910	1,087	+10.2%
1921	1,134	+4.3%
1930	1,278	+12.7%
1950	1,423	+11.3%
1961	1,496	+5.1%
1970	1,174	−21.5%
1980	1,175	+0.1%
1991	1,063	−9.5%
2001	1,109	+4.3%
2011	1,202	+8.4%
2021	1,342	+11.6%
Source: Censuses
