= József Breznay =

Hungarian painter

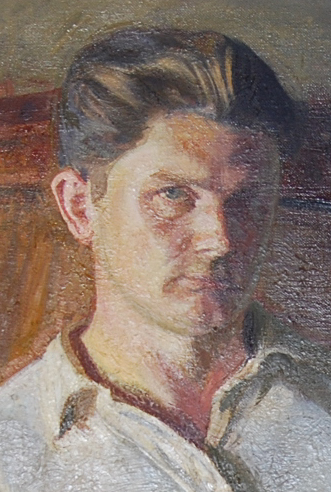
József Breznay's self-portrait from 1950s

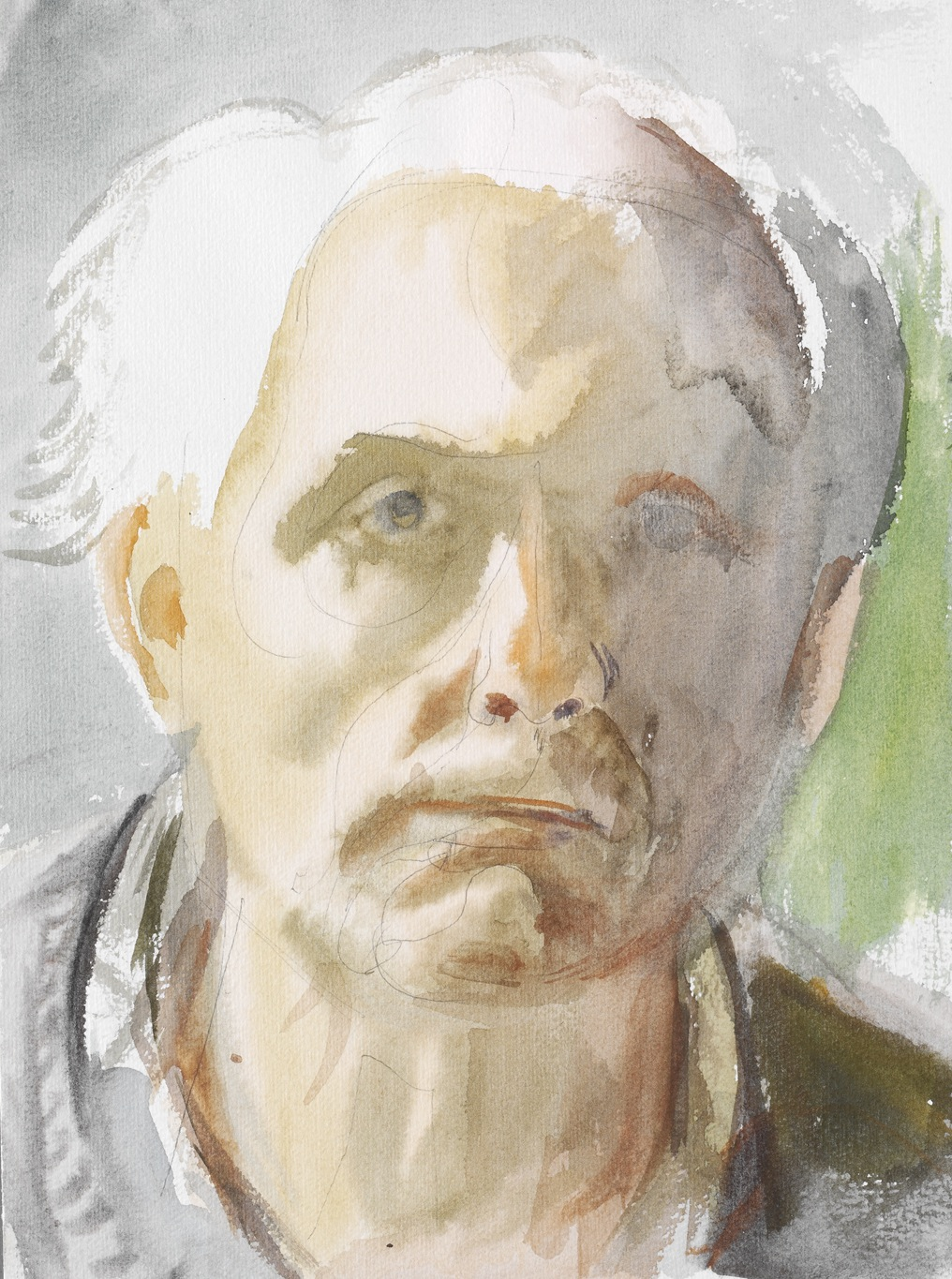
Self-portrait (ca. 1974)

József Breznay (20 September 1916 – 18 February 2012) was a Hungarian painter.

== Biography ==
He was born in Budapest. From 1934 to 1939 he studied at the University of Fine Arts Budapest. His masters were Bertalan Karlovszky, Ágost Benkhard, Rezső Burghardt and István Szőnyi. During 1938–39 he was Szőnyi's teaching assistant.

According to the proposal of Prof. Tibor Gerevich he was appointed to receive the scholarship of the Rome Prize. He worked there as a resident of Collegium Hungaricum between 1939 and 1940. In 1940 he again received the Rome Prize. The young painter matured during these years to a painter of full-fledged style, further developing the school of painters of Nagybánya, (Baia Mare, Romania) featuring a relaxed pictorial quality.

He died on 18 February 2012 in Budapest.

== Personal exhibitions ==
- 1946: Fókusz Galéria, Budapest, Hungary
- 1948: Művész Galéria, Budapest, Hungary
- 1953: Fényes Adolf Terem, Budapest, Hungary
- 1954: Fényes Adolf Terem, Budapest, Hungary
- 1961: István Csók Galéria, Budapest, Hungary
- 1962: Galerie Barbizon, Paris, France
- 1963: Galerie l'Indifferent, Lyon, France
- 1964: Malkasten Kunstverein, Düsseldorf, Germany
- 1965: Kunstkabinett, Hannover, Germany
- 1966: Künstlerkreis, Marburg, Germany
- 1969: Konshallen, Uppsala, Sweden
- 1970: Kunstverein, Lingen, Germany
- 1971: Galerie Pfeiffer, Brussels, Belgium
- 1972: Galerie Oranje, Ghent, Belgium
  - Galerie Goltz, München, Germany
  - Palace of Arts (Budapest) Műcsarnok, Budapest, Hungary
- 1973: Galleria Antelami, Parma, Italy
- 1974: Galleria l'Ascendente, Milan, Italy
- 1975: Staatsgalerie, Würzburg, Germany
  - Galerie A. Vynecke van Eyck, Ghent, Belgium
- 1977: Galleria Mariani, Parma, Italy
  - Club Amici dell'Arte, Ferrara, Italy
  - Kossuth Művelődési Ház, Kölesd, Hungary
- 1978: Galleria Romana, Milan, Italy
  - Művelődési Központ, Csorna, Hungary
- 1979: Galleria Leonessa, Brescia, Italy
  - Galleria Sant'Andrea, Parma, Italy
- 1981: Szőnyi Terem, Miskolc, Hungary
- 1982: Palace of Arts (Budapest), Műcsarnok, Budapest, Hungary
  - Gallery Park, Witten, Germany
- 1983: Galleria Sant'Andrea, Parma, Italy
- 1984: Gallery Park, Witten, Germany
- 1985: Staatsgalerie, Hattingen, Germany
- 1988: Galerie am Gewölbe, Tübingen, Germany
- 1990: Galleria Sant'Andrea, Parma, Italy
- 1996: Collegium, Budapest, Hungary
- 1997: Galerie Marceau, Paris, France
- 1998: Szőnyi István Múzeum, Zebegény, Hungary
- 2000: Galleria Duomo, Milan, Italy
- 2001: Librerie Felltrinelli, Milan, Italy
  - La Rotonde, Paris, France
- 2003: Galéria Melange, Budapest, Hungary
- 2006: Olof Palme Millenniumi Szalon, Budapest, Hungary

== Group exhibitions ==
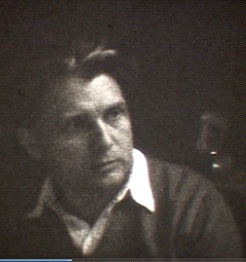
In 1957

- 1940-1941-1947: Római Magyar Akadémia, Rome, Italy
- 1943: Nemzeti Szalon, Budapest, Hungary
- 1944-50 years: Hungarian Art, Fővárosi Képtár, Budapest, Hungary
- 1946: Fókusz Galéria, Budapest, Hungary
- 1947: KEVE Kiállítás, Nemzeti Szalon, Budapest, Hungary
- 1948: 90 Artists, Nemzeti Szalon, Budapest, Hungary
- 1950-1968: I-II. Magyar Képzőművészeti Kiállítás, Budapest, Hungary
- 1955: 10 Years Art, Műcsarnok, Budapest, Hungary
  - Hermann Ottó Múzeum, Miskolc, Hungary
- to begin 1955: Országos Képzőművészeti Kiállítás
- 1957: Salon Populiste, Musee Municipal d'Art Moderne, Paris, France
  - Tavaszi Tárlat, Műcsarnok, Budapest, Hungary
- 1958: 50. Salon d'Automne, Paris, France
- 1960: IV. Exposition Internationale de Peinture, Vichy, France
- 1968: Gallery Guggenheim Jeune, London, England
  - Folkwang Museum, Essen, Germany
- 1969: Magyar Művészet, Műcsarnok Budapest, Hungary
- 1971: XX. Painting Biennale, Florence, Italy
- to begin 1976: Miskolci Teli Tárlat, Miskolc Galéria, Hungary
- 1978: Festészet'77, Műcsarnok, Budapest, Hungary
- 1983: House of Humour and Satire, Gabrovo, Bulgaria
- 1984: Országos Képzőművészeti Kiállítás '84, Műcsarnok, Budapest, Hungary
- 1988: Tavaszi Tárlat, Műcsarnok, Budapest, Hungary
- 1989: XIV. Salon de Peinture de Bourbonne-les-Bains: Gold Medal

== Awards, prizes ==
- 1937: Rotary Club Prize, Hungary
- 1939: Gold Medal of the Hungarian College of Fine Arts, Hungary
- 1939-1941-1947: Scholarship of the Hungarian Academy of Rome, Hungary
- 1942: Nemes Marcell Prize-Szinyei Társaság, Hungary
- 1943: Wolfner Gyula Prize-Szinyei Társaság, Hungary
- 1953: Mihály Munkácsy Prize, Hungary
- to begin 1957: member of Salon des Indépendants, Paris, France
- 1958: István Csók Medal, Hungary
- 1962: Grand Prix, Deauville, France
- 1964: Bronze Medal of the European Council of Arts
- 1976: Silver Medal of Munka Érdemrend, Hungary
- 1978: First prize of Carrara dei Marmi, Italy
- 1989: Gold Medal of Bourbonne-les-Bains, France

== Public collections ==
- Hungarian National Gallery (Magyar Nemzeti Galéria), Budapest, Hungary
- Damjanich János Múzeum, Szolnok, Hungary
- Museum of Applied Arts (Budapest) (Iparművészeti Múzeum), Hungary
- Theatre Lingen, Lingen, Germany
- Herend Porcelain Manufactory Ltd. (Herendi Porcelángyár), Herend, Hungary
- Mobile Museum of Art, Alabama, United States

== Public works ==
- 1939: Mezőkovácsháza, fresco in collaboration with Eugénia Bonda.
- 1954: Komlò
- Secco, Beloiannisz Gyàr
- Berente Church, fresco in collaboration with Gabor Breznay and András Breznay

== Bibliography ==
- Aszalòs Endre: Breznay Jòzsef, 1982, Mai Magyar Művészet
- Breznay József, Műcsarnok 1982, catalogue
- Breznay József, Evolúció, 1996, catalogue
- József Breznay, Mostra retrospectiva, 1997, catalogue
- Breznay József, Public and Private Collections, 2007

== Films, videos ==
- MTV 1: Vitray Tamás: Csak ülök és mesélek: A Breznay csalàd, (The Breznay Family) 25 December 1996
- HírTV : Family tale (Családmese) : " Vasarely, az ecsetkirály és a Breznay család", 25 December 2005
- Ostoros Ágnes: "A történetek igazak". Portrait of József Breznay, (documentary film) 2007. Cinema Bem, Budapest, 2008 January
