= Brezno (disambiguation) =

Brezno is a town in central Slovakia.

Brezno may also refer to:

== Czech Republic ==
- Březno (disambiguation)

== Slovenia ==
- Brezno, Laško, a village in the Municipality of Laško
- Brezno, Podvelka, a village in the Municipality of Podvelka
