= Breznik, Črnomelj =

Village in southern Slovenia

Breznik
- Location in Slovenia
- Coordinates: 45°31′20.48″N 15°9′28.14″E
- Country: Slovenia
- Traditional region: White Carniola
- Statistical region: Southeast Slovenia
- Municipality: Črnomelj

Area
  - Total: 0.86 km^{2} (0.33 sq mi)
- Elevation: 156.2 m (512 ft)

Population (2020)
  - Total: 24
  - Density: 28/km^{2} (72/sq mi)
- Postal code: 8343

Breznik (pronounced [ˈbɾeːznik]) is a small settlement northwest of Dragatuš in the Municipality of Črnomelj in the White Carniola area of southeastern Slovenia. The area is part of the traditional region of Lower Carniola and is now included in the Southeast Slovenia Statistical Region.

There is a 16th-century mansion known as Turn Mansion (Slovene: Dvorec Turn) south of the village.
