= Březnice (Tábor District) =

- Municipality
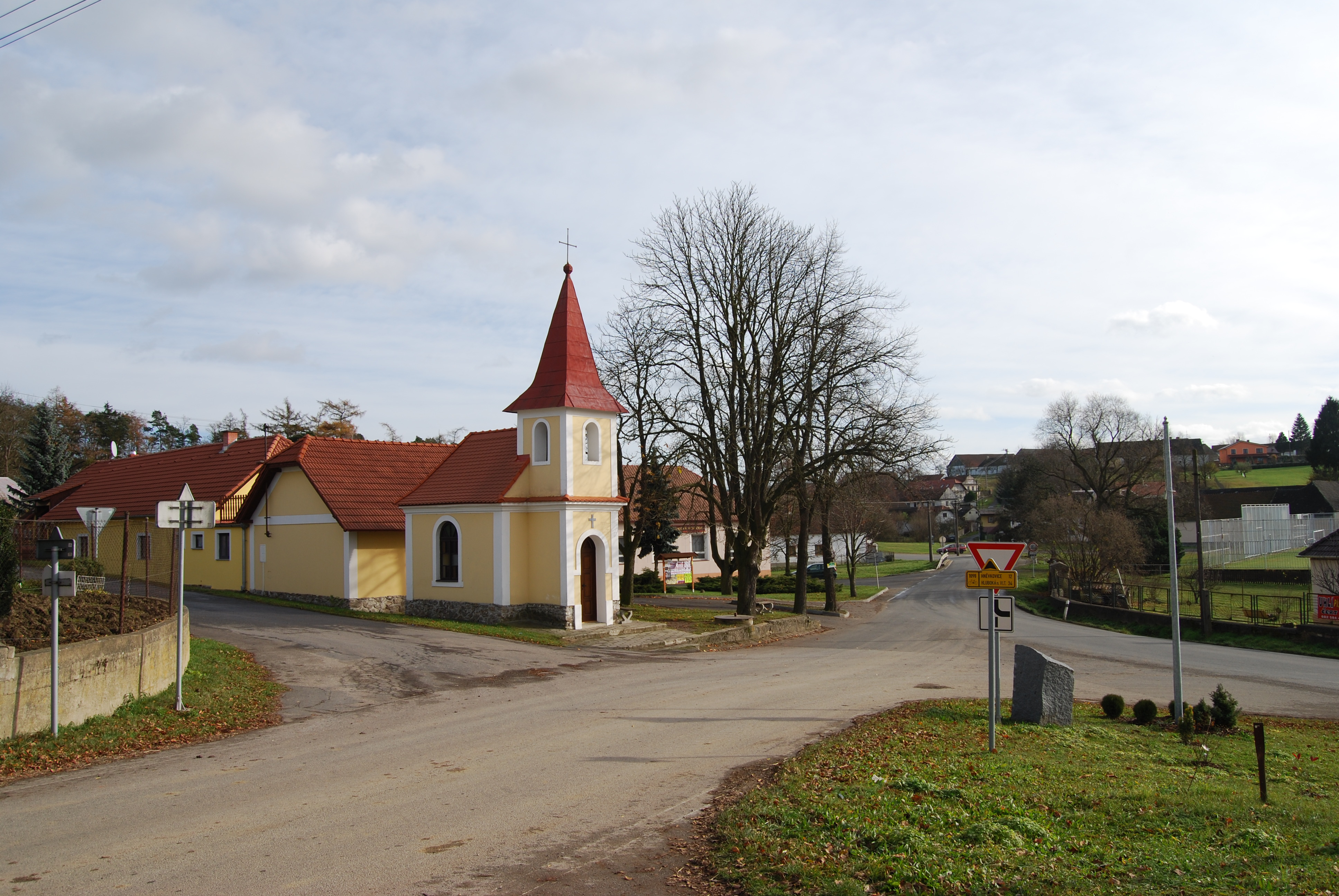
- Chapel in the centre of Březnice

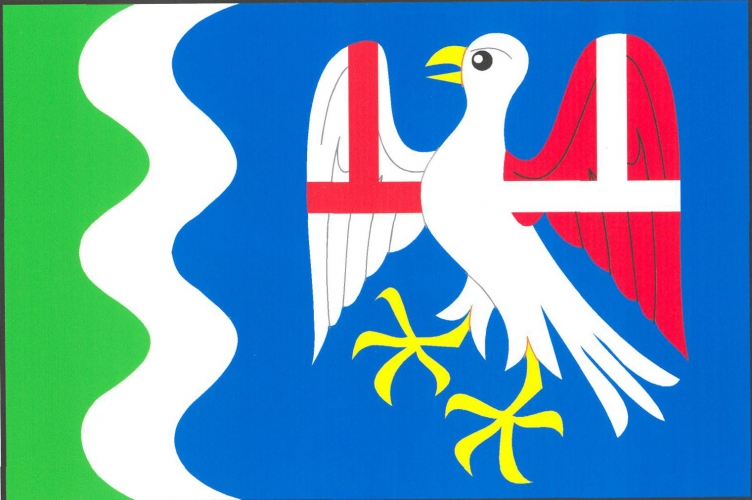
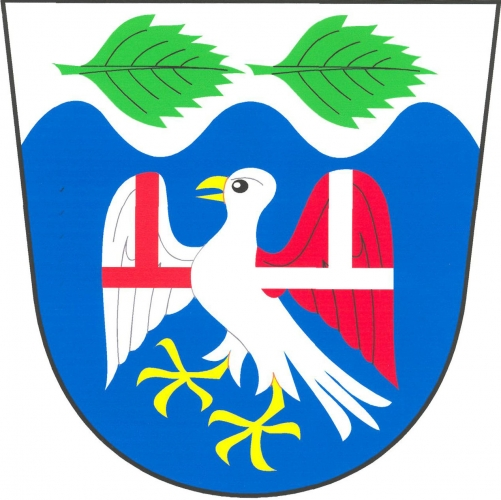
- Flag Coat of arms

- Location in the Czech Republic
- Coordinates: 49°15′7″N 14°30′50″E
- Country: Czech Republic
- Region: South Bohemian
- District: Tábor
- First mentioned: 1293

Area
  - Total: 6.91 km^{2} (2.67 sq mi)
- Elevation: 424 m (1,391 ft)

Population (2026-01-01)
  - Total: 267
  - Density: 38.6/km^{2} (100/sq mi)
- Time zone: UTC+1 (CET)
  - Summer (DST): UTC+2 (CEST)
- Postal code: 391 71
- Website: www.obecbreznice.cz

Březnice is a municipality and village in Tábor District in the South Bohemian Region of the Czech Republic. It has about 300 inhabitants.

Březnice lies approximately 21 kilometres (13 mi) south-west of Tábor, 32 km (20 mi) north of České Budějovice, and 92 km (57 mi) south of Prague.

== Demographics ==
Historical population
Year	Pop.	±%
1869	447	—
1880	444	−0.7%
1890	486	+9.5%
1900	505	+3.9%
1910	466	−7.7%
1921	479	+2.8%
1930	426	−11.1%
1950	261	−38.7%
1961	259	−0.8%
1970	242	−6.6%
1980	222	−8.3%
1991	214	−3.6%
2001	233	+8.9%
2011	198	−15.0%
2021	226	+14.1%
Source: Censuses
