= Breznik (surname) =

Breznik is a surname. Notable people with the surname include:

- Melitta Breznik (born 1961), Austrian writer and psychiatrist
- Miha Kompan Breznik (born 2003), Slovene footballer
- Rajmond Breznik, Hungarian football player and coach
- Tony Breznik (born 1984), Austrian bodybuilder
