= Brezna, Kraljevo =

Brezna Брезна (Serbian)
- Village (Selo)
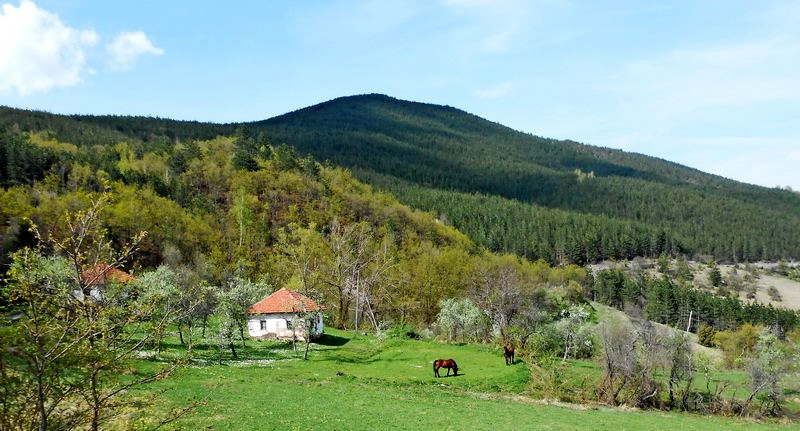
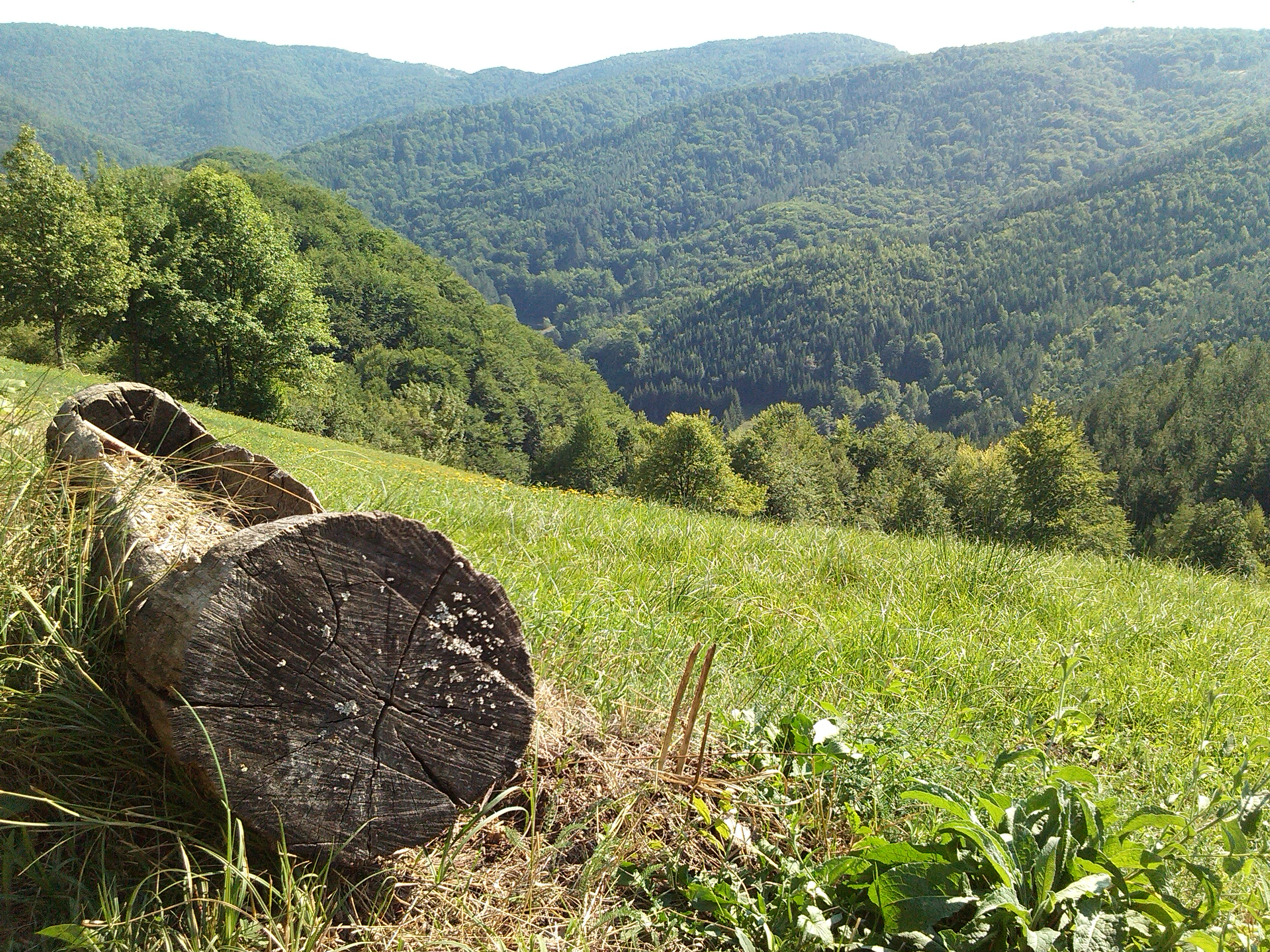
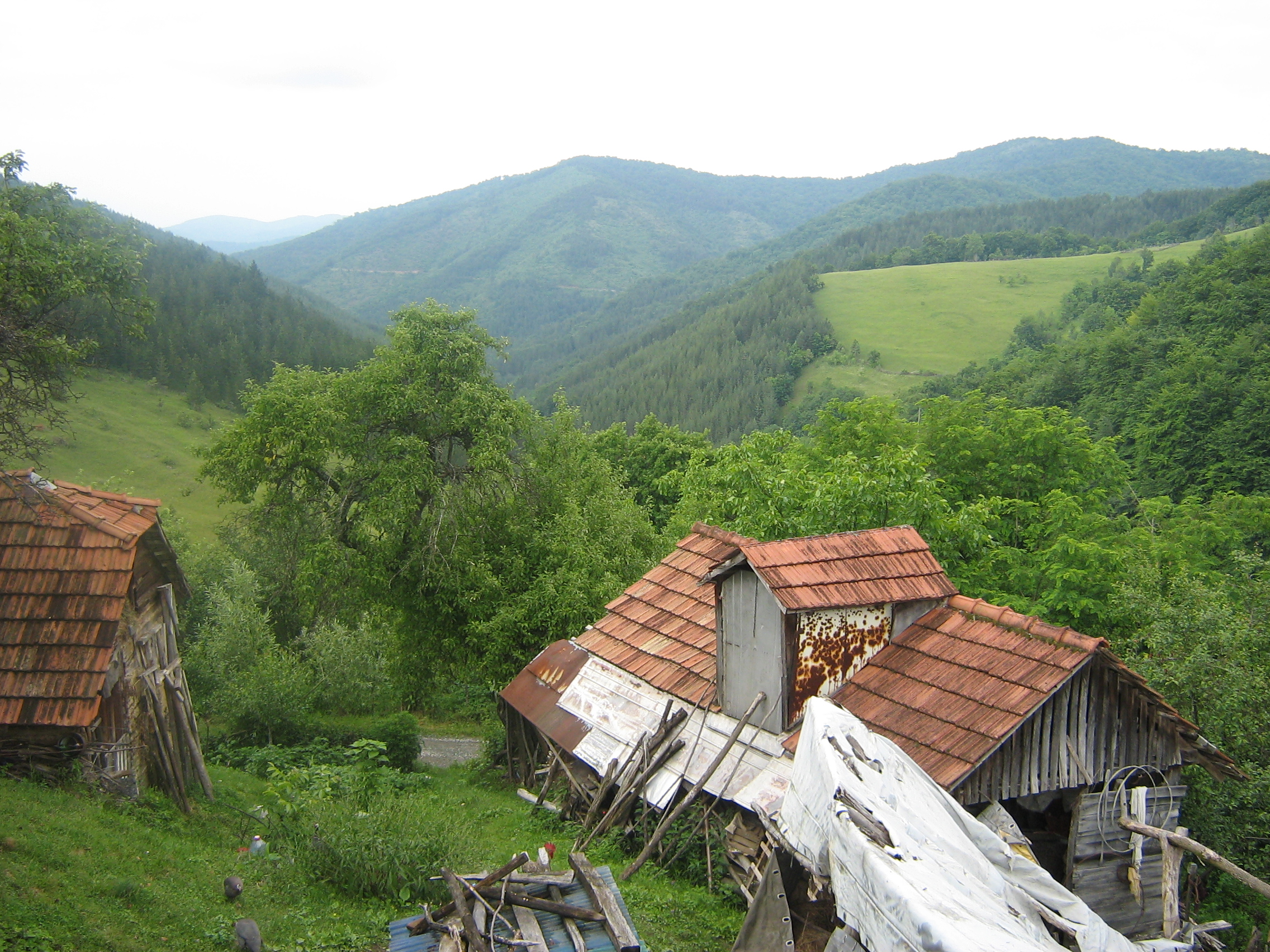

- Location within Serbia
- Coordinates: 43°33′N 20°40′E
- Country: Serbia
- District: Raška District
- Municipality: Kraljevo

Population (2002)
  - Total: 104
- Time zone: UTC+1 (CET)
  - Summer (DST): UTC+2 (CEST)

Brezna is a village in the municipality of Kraljevo, western-central Serbia. According to the 2002 census, the village has a population of 104 people. PSD Gvozdac Mountain home "Zorica Gizdavić" is located in village of Brezna
