= Březno =

Březno may refer to places in the Czech Republic:

- Březno (Chomutov District), a municipality and village in the Ústí nad Labem Region
- Březno (Mladá Boleslav District), a market town in the Central Bohemian Region
- Březno, a village and part of Postoloprty in the Ústí nad Labem Region
- Březno, a village and part of Velemín in the Ústí nad Labem Region
- Krásné Březno, an administrative part of Ústí nad Labem in the Ústí nad Labem Region
- Malé Březno (Most District), a municipality and village in the Ústí nad Labem Region
- Malé Březno (Ústí nad Labem District), a municipality and village in the Ústí nad Labem Region
- Velké Březno, a municipality and village in the Ústí nad Labem Region

== See also ==
- Brezno (disambiguation), Slovakia
