= Rajmond Breznik =

Hungarian footballer and manager

Personal information
- Place of birth: Hungary
- Position: Midfielder

Senior career*
| Years | Team | Apps | (Gls) |
| 1913–1914 | Újpest | 3 | (0) |
| 1918–1919 | Budapesti TC | 1 | (0) |
| –1924 | Juda Makabi | | |
| 1924–192x | NTK Novi Sad | | |

Managerial career
- 193x: Cibalia
- Bačka Mol
- * Club domestic league appearances and goals

Rajmond Breznik was a Hungarian football player and coach.

He played in the Hungarian championship with Újpest FC in the season 1913–14 and with Budapesti TC in 1918–19. He also played in Yugoslavia with Juda Makabi Novi Sad, and since summer 1924 with NTK Novi Sad.

He later worked as coach with Yugoslav clubs HNK Cibalia and FK Bačka Mol.
