= Gábor Breznay =

French painter

- Born: 6 April 1956; Budapest, Hungary
- Died: 13 April 2022 (aged 66); Paris, France
- Known for: Painter

Gabor Breznay (6 April 1956 – 13 April 2022) was a Hungarian painter who worked mainly in Paris, France.

== Life and career ==
He was the son of József Breznay, a Hungarian painter. Breznay was a graduate of the Paris Beaux-Arts School. He had many exhibitions in France and Europe. His work is in private collections in France, Germany, Italy, the United States, and Hungary. He also has work in the public collection of the Town of Pontoise in France. He is represented by the Galerie Stackl'r.

== Various artwork ==
Year	Work
2009	3D Work at Colbert Park, Paris (11 October 2009)
1999	Poster créated for the Town of Pontoise
1993	Collaboration Wall painting in Berente, Hungary
1990	3D Work for France Telecom: " Homme-Telephone"

== Personal exhibitions ==
Year	Work	Venue
2007	Galerie Art...Point de Suspension	Florac
2000	Galerie A Part	Paris
2000	Espace Icare	Issy-les-Moulineaux
1994	Conseil Régional d'Île-de-France	Paris
1991	Tour Saint Aubin	Angers
1987	Galerie Bernanos	Paris
1983	Galerie Limugal	Paris

== Group shows ==
Year	Work	Venue
2009	Mairie du 11e	Paris
2006-9	Artistes à la Bastille	Paris
2003-4	Galerie Globart	Rouen
2001-5	"13 en Vue"	Paris
2000-5	Mednyanszky Tarsasag	Budapest
2001	Carré d'Artistes	Aix-en-Provence
2001	Galerie Bernanos	Paris
1996	Galerie Samagra	Paris
1995	Galerie Origin	Orléans
1993	Salon de Printemps	Clichy
1990	Art et Téléphones	Paris
1988	Novembre à Vitry	Vitry sur Seine
1985	Biennale des Friedens	Hambourg
1983	Art Expo Dallas	Dallas, USA
