= Breznica pod Lubnikom =

Breznica pod Lubnikom Breznica (until 1953)
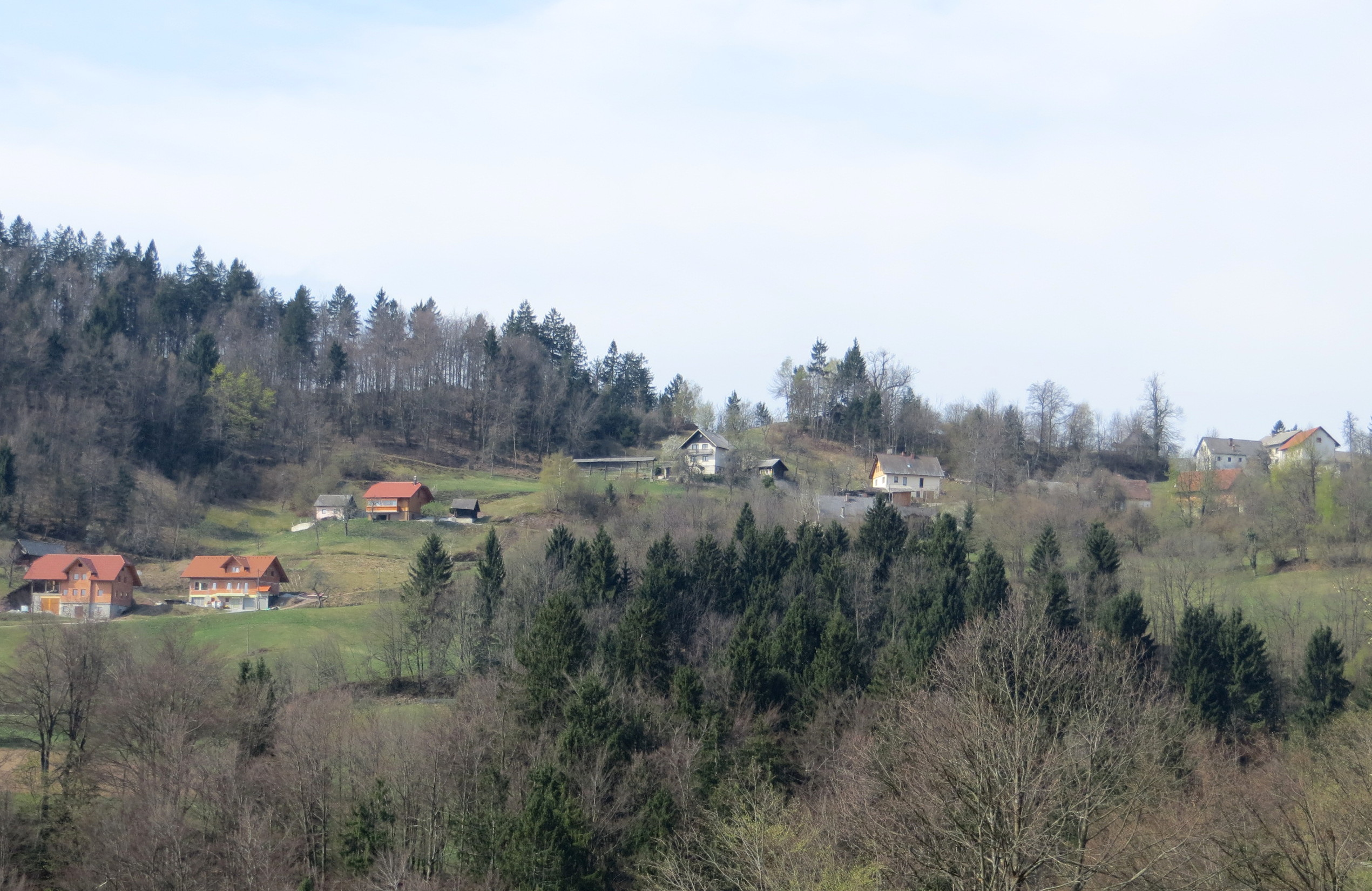

- Location in Slovenia
- Coordinates: 46°9′30.01″N 14°15′49.65″E
- Country: Slovenia
- Traditional region: Upper Carniola
- Statistical region: Upper Carniola
- Municipality: Škofja Loka

Area
  - Total: 4.51 km^{2} (1.74 sq mi)
- Elevation: 696.2 m (2,284 ft)

Population (2002)
  - Total: 42

Breznica pod Lubnikom (pronounced [ˈbɾeːznitsa pɔd lubˈniːkɔm]) is a village in the Municipality of Škofja Loka in the Upper Carniola region of Slovenia.

== Geography ==
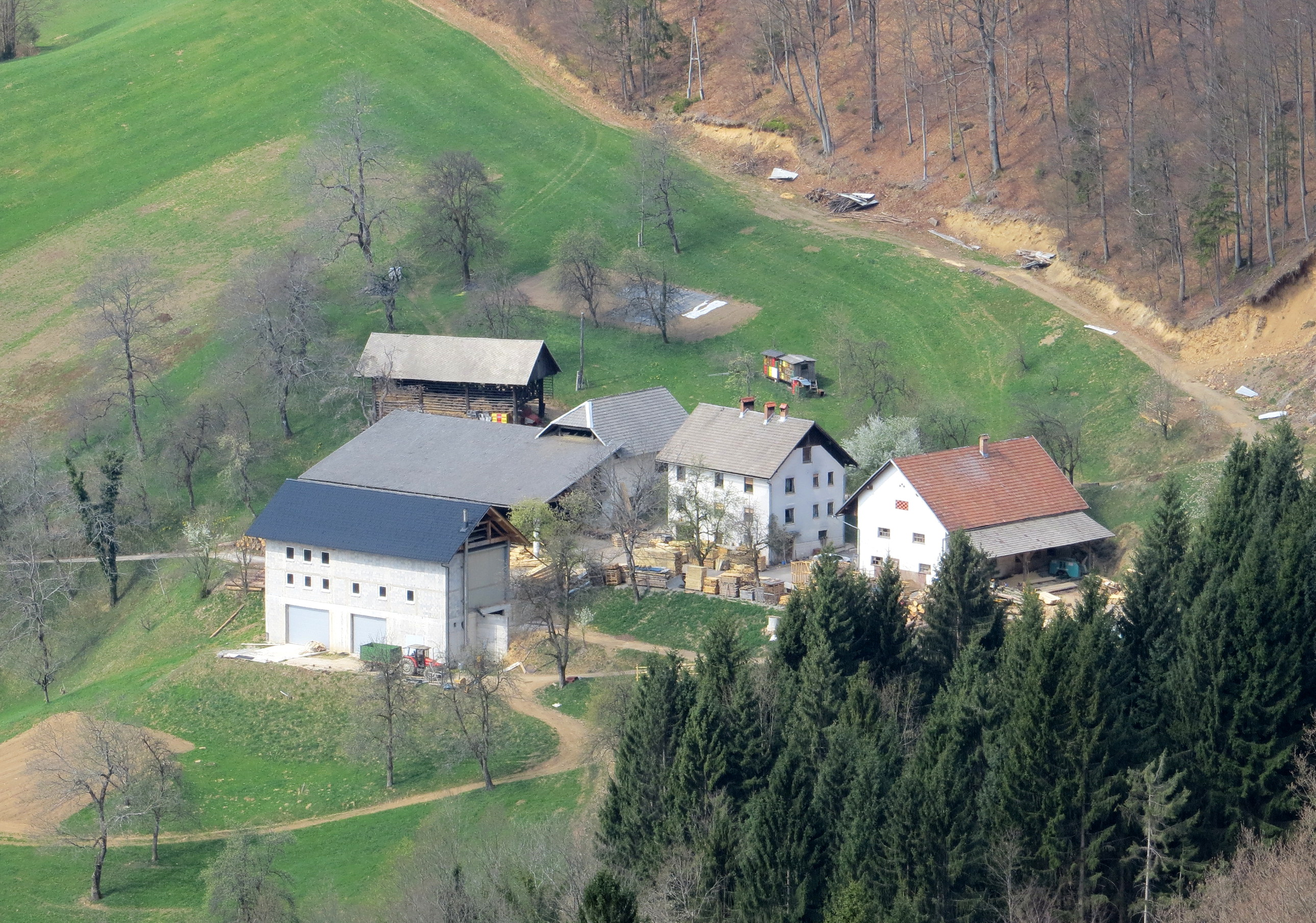
Potočnik

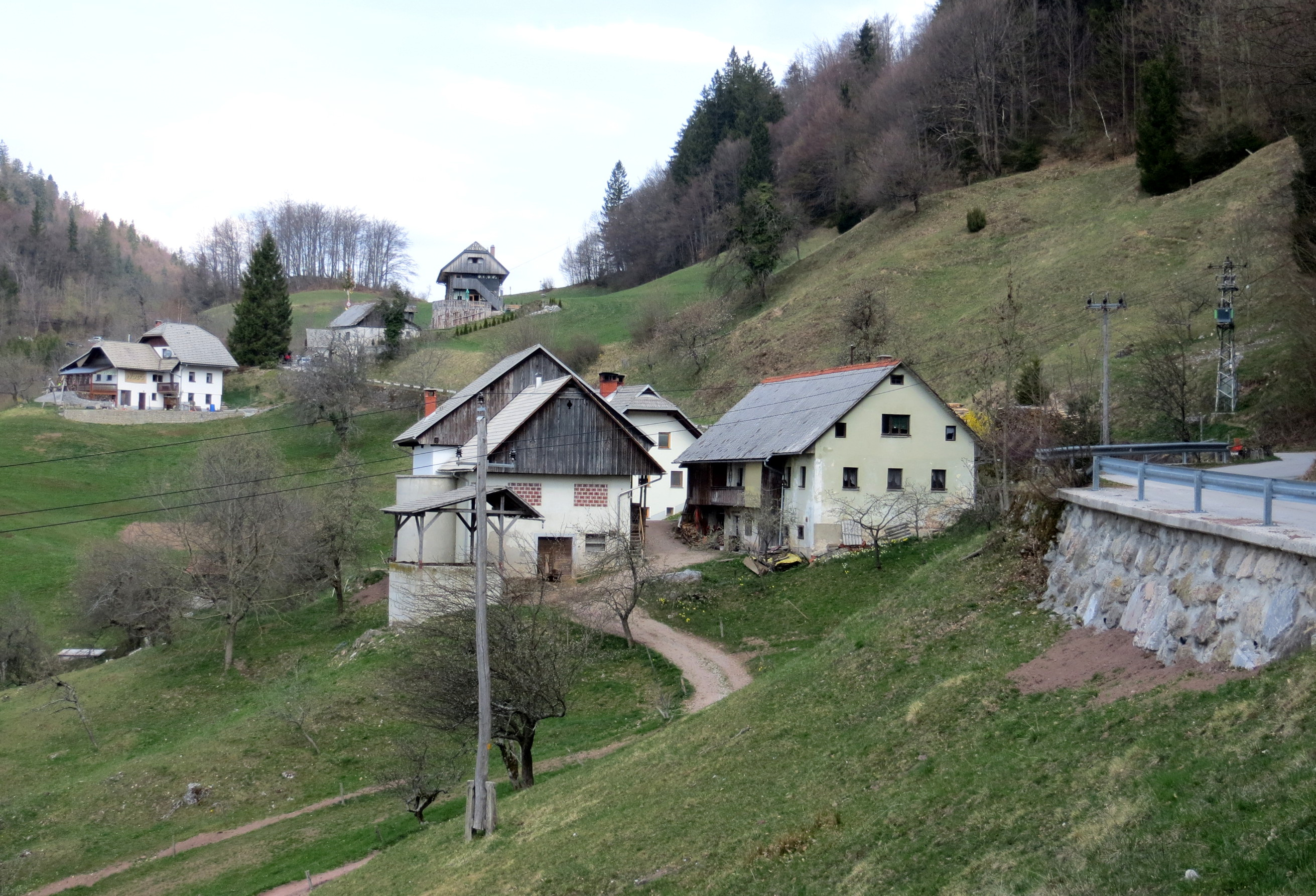
Pri Nacetu

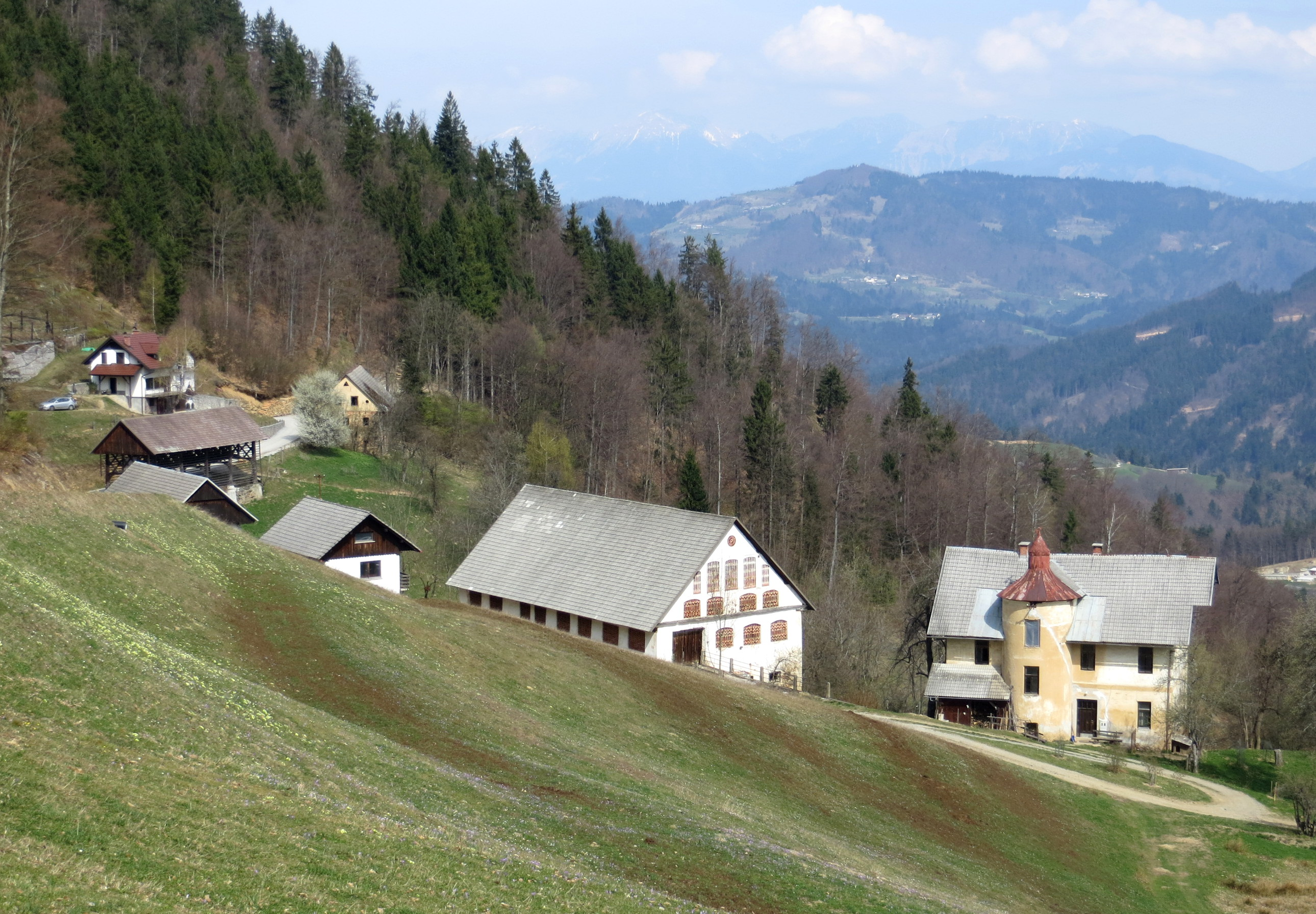
Zalubnikar

Hamlets of Breznica pod Lubnikom

Breznica pod Lubnikom is a village with a clustered core on the south slope of Mount Lubnik (1,025 meters or 3,363 feet). It also included the hamlets and isolated farms of Dolinček, Potočnik, Pri Nacetu, Rohotnik, Zalubnikar, and Žerinc. The Breznica Gorge (Brezniška grapa) lies to the east, the Potočnik Gorge (Potočniška grapa) to the northwest below Pleše Hill (941 meters or 3,087 feet), and the Sopotnik Gorge (Sopotniška grapa) to the west below Hoje Hill (821 meters or 2,694 feet). The village is connected by road to Podpulfrca in the Poljane Sora Valley to the southeast.

== Name ==
Breznica pod Lubnikom was attested in written sources as Brieznitz in 1291 and Nabresnitzi in 1500, among other spellings. The name of the settlement was changed from Breznica to Breznica pod Lubnikom in 1953. The name is derived from the common noun breza 'birch'. Like similar toponyms in Slovenia (e.g., Brezova, Brezovec, Brezovci), it originally referred to the local vegetation.

== History ==
Ancient settlement in the area is attested by the discovery of Neolithic artifacts above the village in Lubnik Cave (Slovene: Lubniška jama, also known as Kevdrc Cave) on the south slope of Mount Lubnik. During the Second World War, the Partisans Peter Kavčič (a.k.a. Jegorov; 1908–1944) and Danila Kumar (a.k.a. Andreja; 1921–1944), later named a People's Hero of Yugoslavia, were killed in fighting here. They are commemorated by a monument.

=== Clandestine grave ===
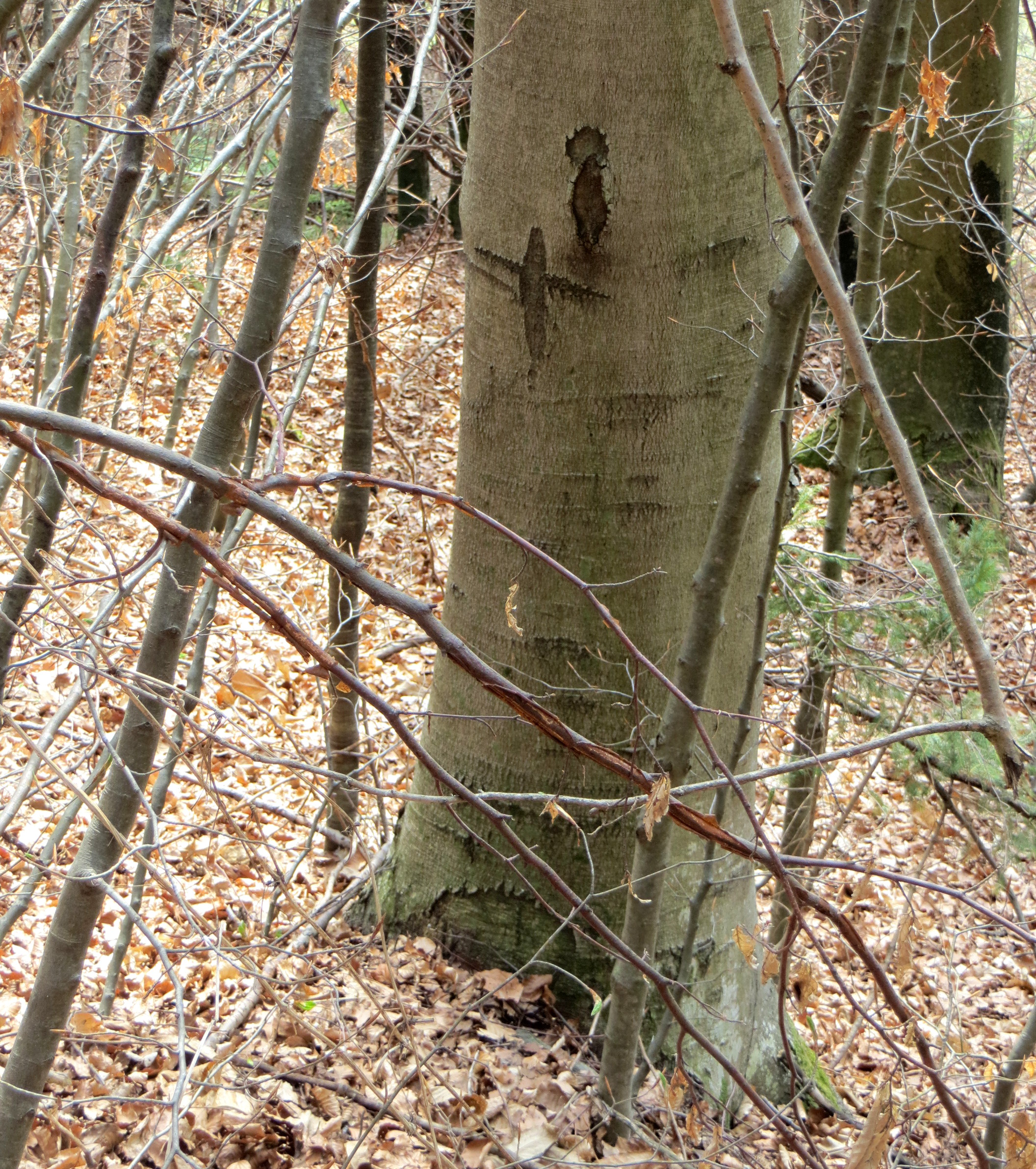
Beech tree with a carved cross near the grave of Gabrijela Lukanc

Breznica pod Lubnikom is the site of a clandestine grave from the Second World War. The Breznica Grave (Slovene: Grobišče Breznica) is located on a steep slope 10 m below the road northwest of the village. It contains the remains of the civilian Gabrijela Lukanc (1921–1944), whom the Partisans abducted from her home in Puštal and murdered after several days.

== Notable people ==
Notable people that were born or lived in Breznica pod Lubnikom include:

- Frank J. Kern (1887–1977), editor, writer, and physician
- Lovro Sušnik (1887–1964), philologist
