= Vrhovec =

Vrhovec is a surname. Notable people with the surname include:

- Blaž Vrhovec (born 1992), Slovenian footballer
- Janez Vrhovec (1921–1997), Serbian actor
- Josip Vrhovec (1926–2006), Croatian partisan and communist politician
