= Karlino =

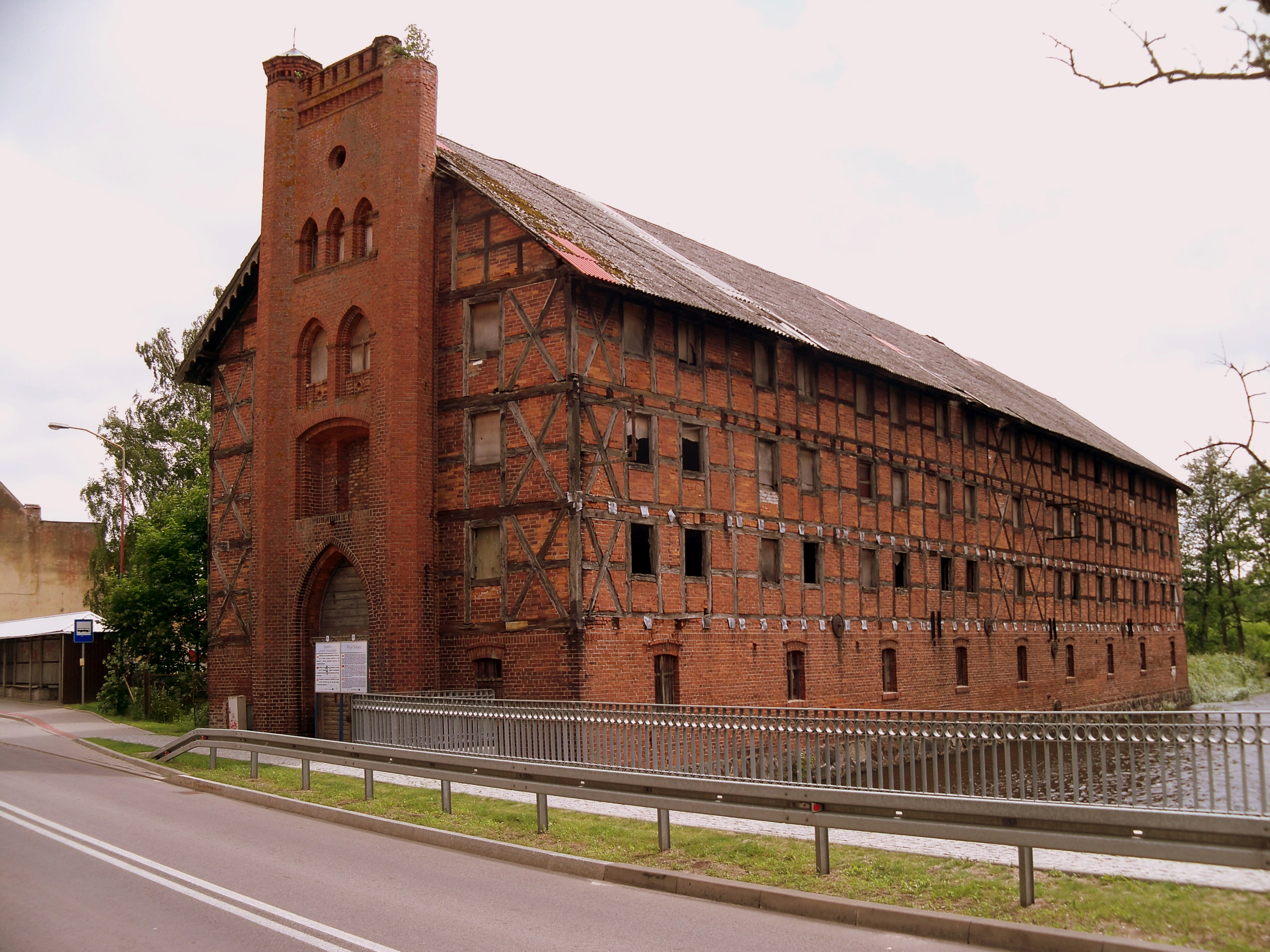
- Historical granary

- Flag Coat of arms

- Location within Poland
- Coordinates: 54°2′21″N 15°52′43″E
- Country: Poland
- Voivodeship: West Pomeranian
- County: Białogard
- Gmina: Karlino

Area
  - Total: 9.21 km^{2} (3.56 sq mi)

Population (2006)
  - Total: 5,794
  - Density: 629/km^{2} (1,630/sq mi)
- Postal code: 78-230
- Website: www.karlino.pl

Karlino [karˈlʲinɔ] (German: Körlin an der Persante) is a town in Białogard County, West Pomeranian Voivodeship, Poland. It has a population of 5,729 (2004).

== History ==
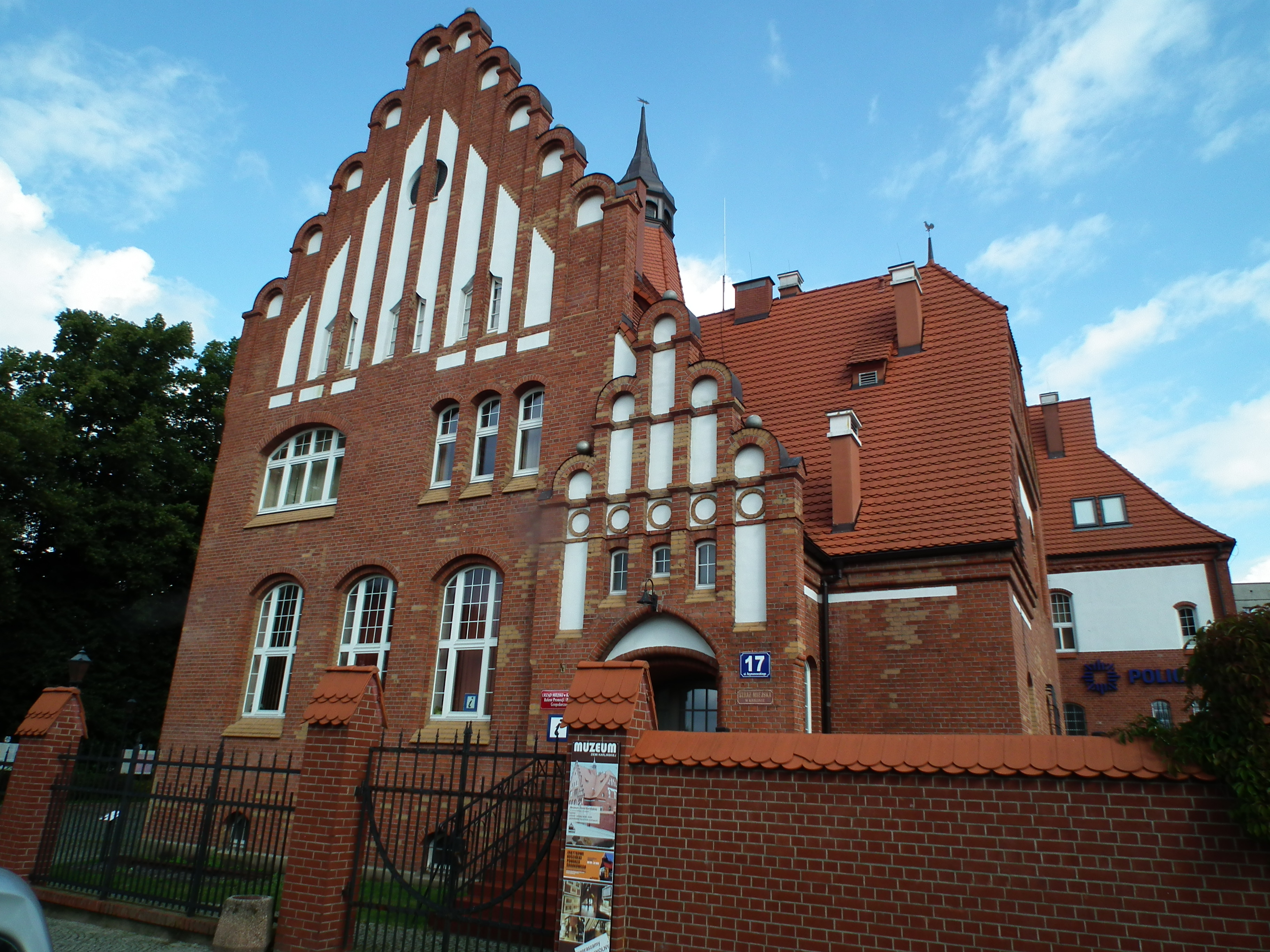
Museum of Karlino Land

The territory became part of the emerging Polish state under its first ruler Mieszko I around 967. The village of Karlino was first mentioned in 1240, and Karlino was then part of the Prince-Bishopric of Kamień Pomorski. Since the 14th century, the bishops of Kamień Pomorski had their residence in Karlino, which was their property. In 1409, Boguslaw VIII, Duke of Słupsk and former bishop of Kamień, attacked the castle and plundered the town during his conflict with the bishops of Kamień. In 1500, the town's old privileges were confirmed.

From 1544, it was part of the Duchy of Pomerania. The town has suffered from fires in 1556 and 1685. During the Thirty Years' War, in 1643, troops of the Holy Roman Empire burnt 24 down houses. In 1653, it passed under Brandenburg-Prussian rule, and from 1871 to 1945 it was also part of Germany, administratively located in the Province of Pomerania. In 1761, during the Seven Years' War, the Russians shelled the town. In the winter of 1838–1839, a treasure trove containing gold bracteates, solidi, rings and braceletes from the Migration Period was discovered by accident.

During World War II, in February 1945, the German-perpetrated death march of Allied prisoners-of-war from the Stalag XX-B POW camp passed through the town. Following Germany's defeat in the war, in 1945, the town became again part of Poland.

The town is known in Poland for an oil gusher at a nearby exploration oil well, which erupted and caught fire on December 9, 1980. It burned until January 14, 1981, when it was finally put out, after dominating the news for weeks. However, the hopes for oil riches which this event engendered were brief, and in the end, the amount of oil discovered was not sufficient for profitable production.

== Sights ==
Main sights of Karlino include:

- Gothic Church of Saint Michael Archangel
- Old granary
- Town hall (Ratusz)
- Muzeum Ziemi Karlińskiej (Museum of Karlino Land)
- Municipal Park

== International relations ==
Karlino is twinned with:

Dargun, Germany; Skælskør, Denmark	Wolgast, Germany
