= Legionów Józefa Piłsudskiego Street =

Street in Kraków, Poland

Legionów Józefa Piłsudskiego street
Kraków
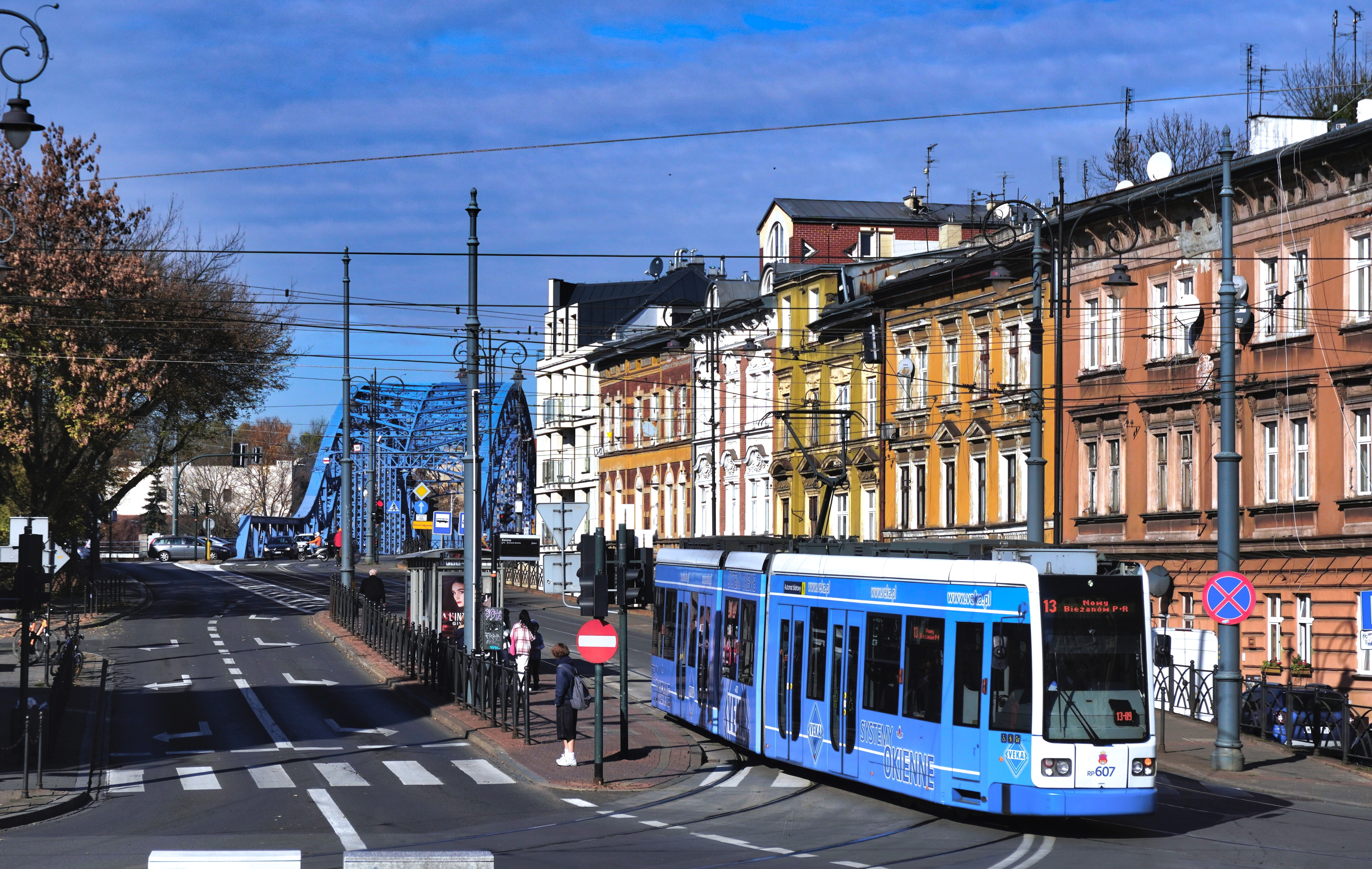
- View of the street
- Interactive map of Legionów Józefa Piłsudskiego street
- Part of: Kraków Podgórze district
- Owner: City of Kraków
- Location: Kraków, Poland

Legionów Józefa Piłsudskiego Street in Kraków is a street in Kraków, in District XIII Podgórze.

It runs from the Józef Piłsudski Bridge, precisely from the intersection with Karol Rolle and Przy Moście streets, southeastward to the intersection with Kalwaryjska Street, and then along the eastern side of Niepodległości Square to Jan Zamoyski Street.

== History ==
The street was laid out at the end of the 19th century within the borders of the then-independent town of Podgórze. In the mid-1930s, it took its current shape in connection with the construction of the Piłsudski Bridge.

Over the years, the street's name changed multiple times. From its creation until 1917, it was named 3 Maja Street. After Podgórze was incorporated into Kraków, it was renamed Legionów Street. In 1940, during the Nazi occupation, it was given the name Brückenstraße. In 1945, it returned to its pre-war name, Legionów Street. In 1951, it was named after Zygmunt Wróblewski. Between 1959 and 1990, two sections of the street had different names: the segment between Rollego and Kalwaryjska Streets was named after Stanisław Cekiery, while the segment from Kalwaryjska to Zamoyski Street bore the name of Antoni Stawarz.

In 1990, the name Legionów Street was reinstated, and a year later, in 1991, it adopted its current name, referring specifically to the Polish Legions military formation established in 1914 under the leadership of Józef Piłsudski.

In 2004, the tram line running along the street was modernized.

== Building ==
The eastern side of the street is lined with two-story tenement houses, most of which were built in the late 19th century in a historicist style. On the western side, the development along the street is less dense. At the corner with Sokolska Street stands a historic building that once housed the Tadeusz Kościuszko Boys' Primary School No. 24, built in a historicist style in 1881. Since 2011, it has served as the headquarters of the Podgórze Cultural Center. Near the intersection with Kalwaryjska Street, there was once the Podgórze market hall, dating back to the late 19th century. It was demolished around 1933 to make way for the entrance to the Piłsudski Bridge as part of the street's realignment.

- 3 Legionów Józefa Piłsudskiego Street – Tenement house in an eclectic style, built in 1893.
- 5 Legionów Józefa Piłsudskiego Street – Tenement house in an eclectic style, built in 1897.
- 7 Legionów Józefa Piłsudskiego Street – Tenement house in a historicist style, built in 1896.
- 9 Legionów Józefa Piłsudskiego Street – Historicist-style tenement house designed by Stanisław Serkowski, built in 1891.
- 11 Legionów Józefa Piłsudskiego Street – Tenement house in a historicist style, built in 1897.
- 13 Legionów Józefa Piłsudskiego Street (8 Kalwaryjska Street) – Historic tenement house, built in 1894.
- 15 Legionów Józefa Piłsudskiego Street (7 Kalwaryjska Street) – Historic tenement house, built after 1900.
- 17 Legionów Józefa Piłsudskiego Street – Tenement house in a historicist style, built around 1897.
- 21 Legionów Józefa Piłsudskiego Street – Tenement house in a historicist style, built before 1900.
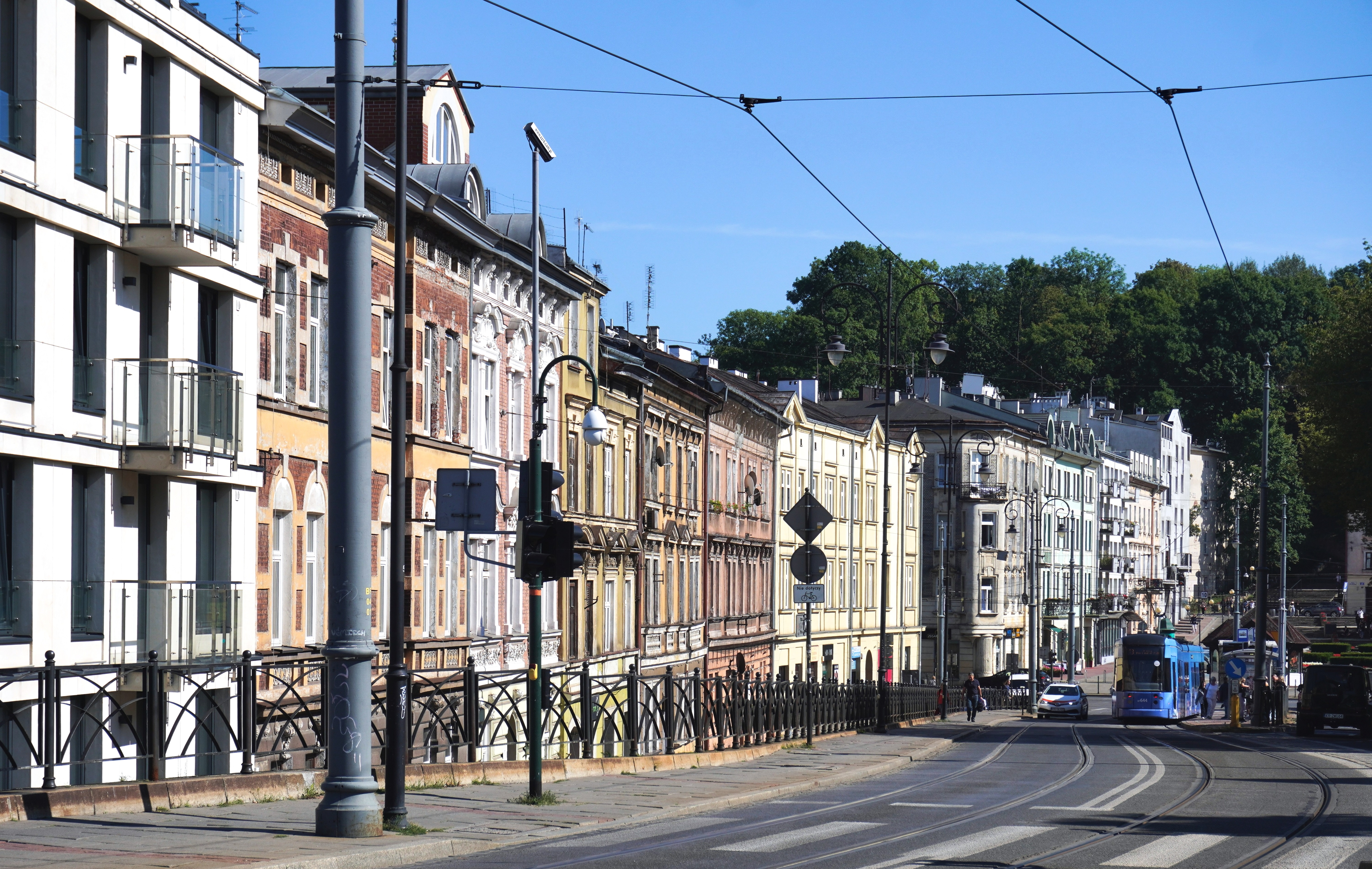
View from the north-west, from the intersection with Street Karol Rolle

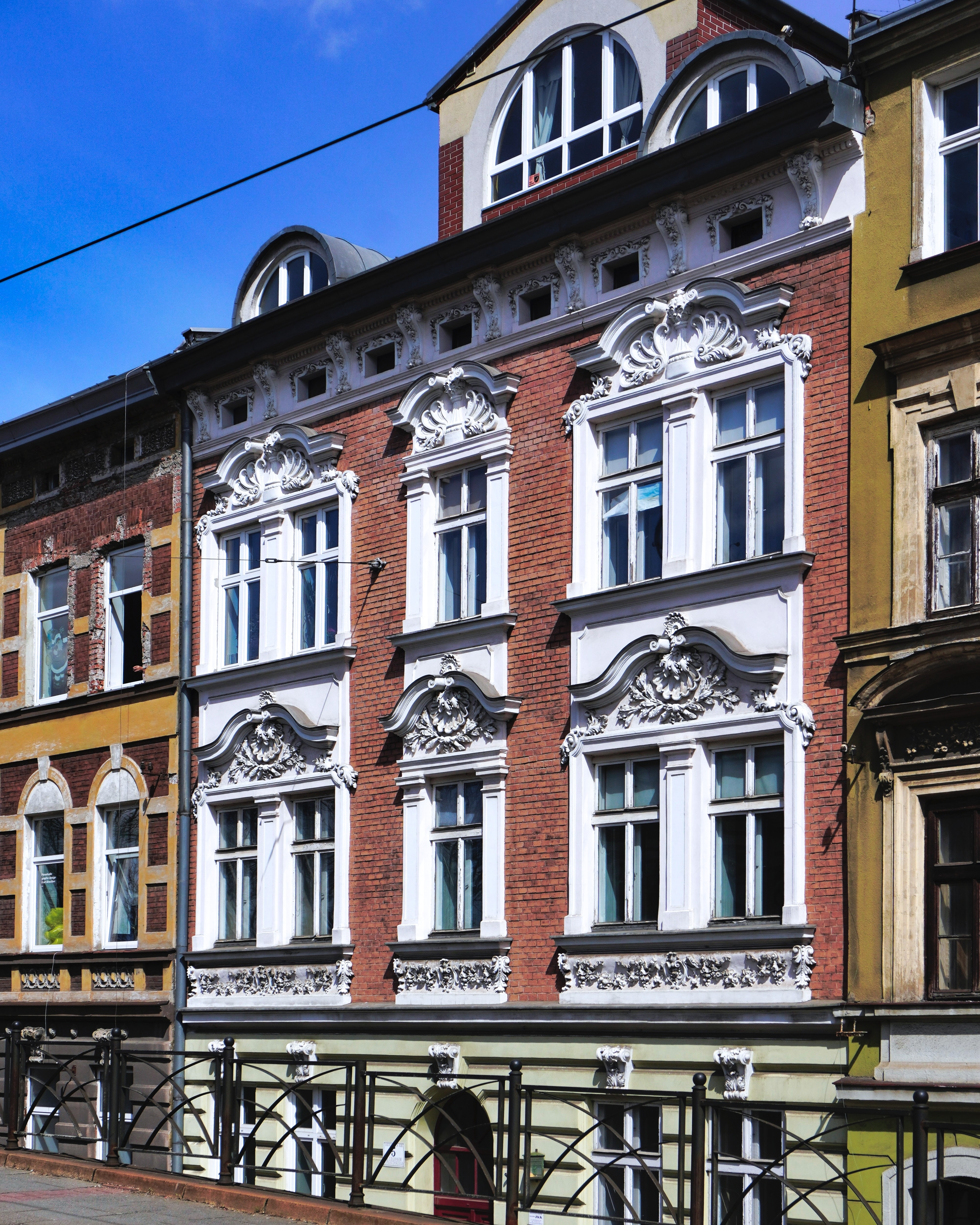
5 Legionów Józefa Piłsudskiego Street
Tenement house (1897)

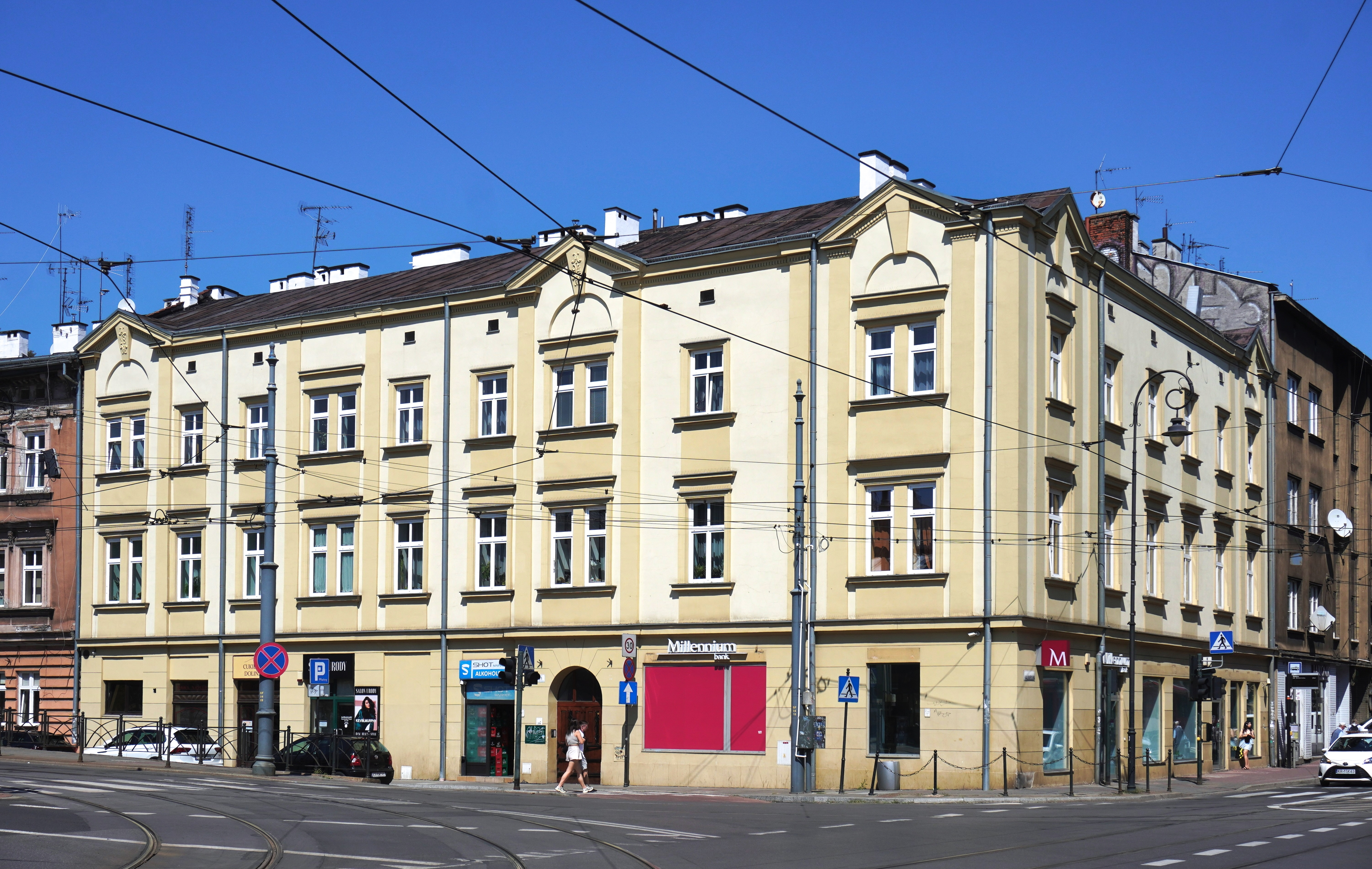
13 Legionów Józefa Piłsudskiego Street (8 Kalwaryjska Street)
Tenement house (1894)

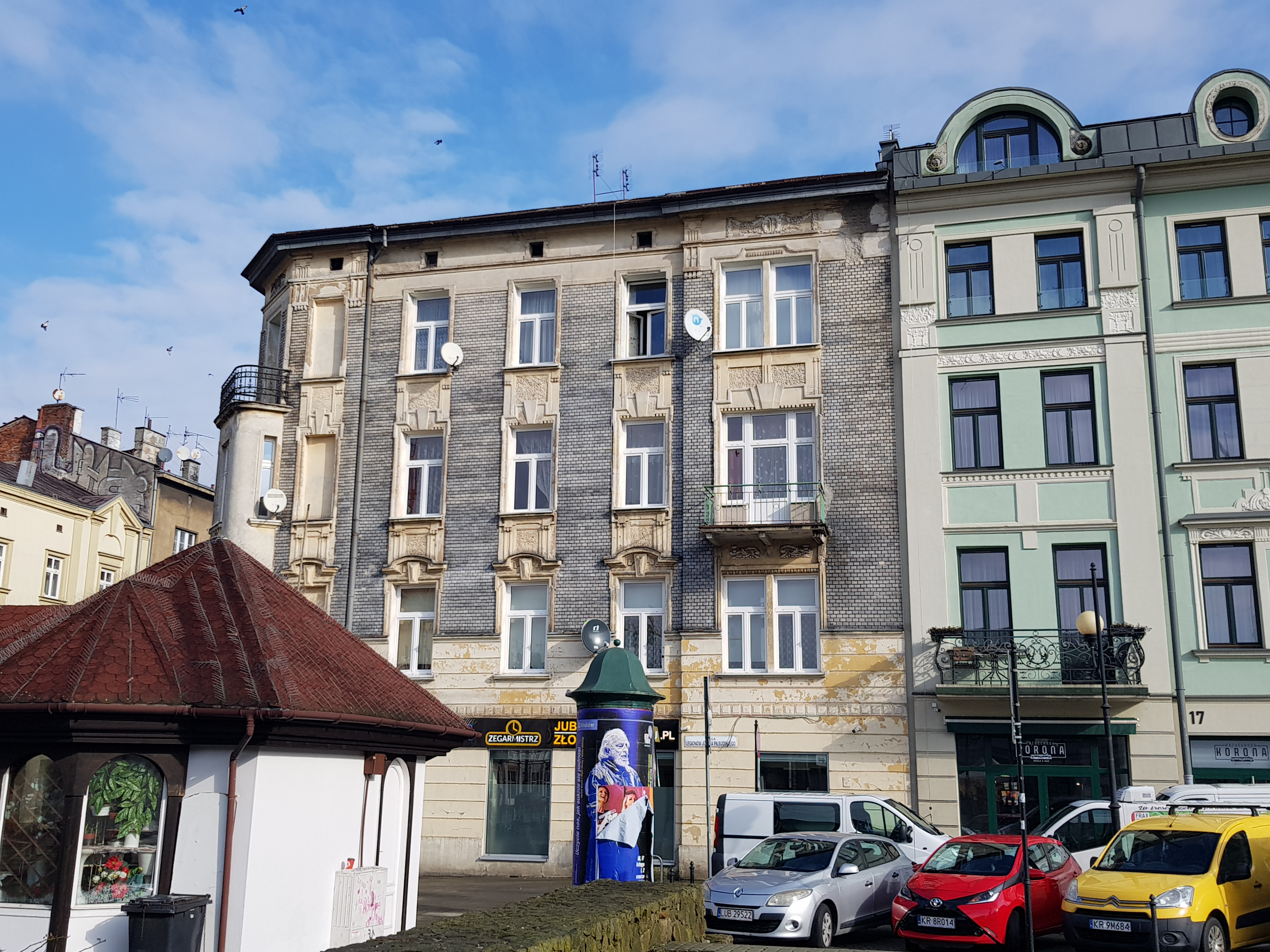
15 Legionów Józefa Piłsudskiego Street (1900)

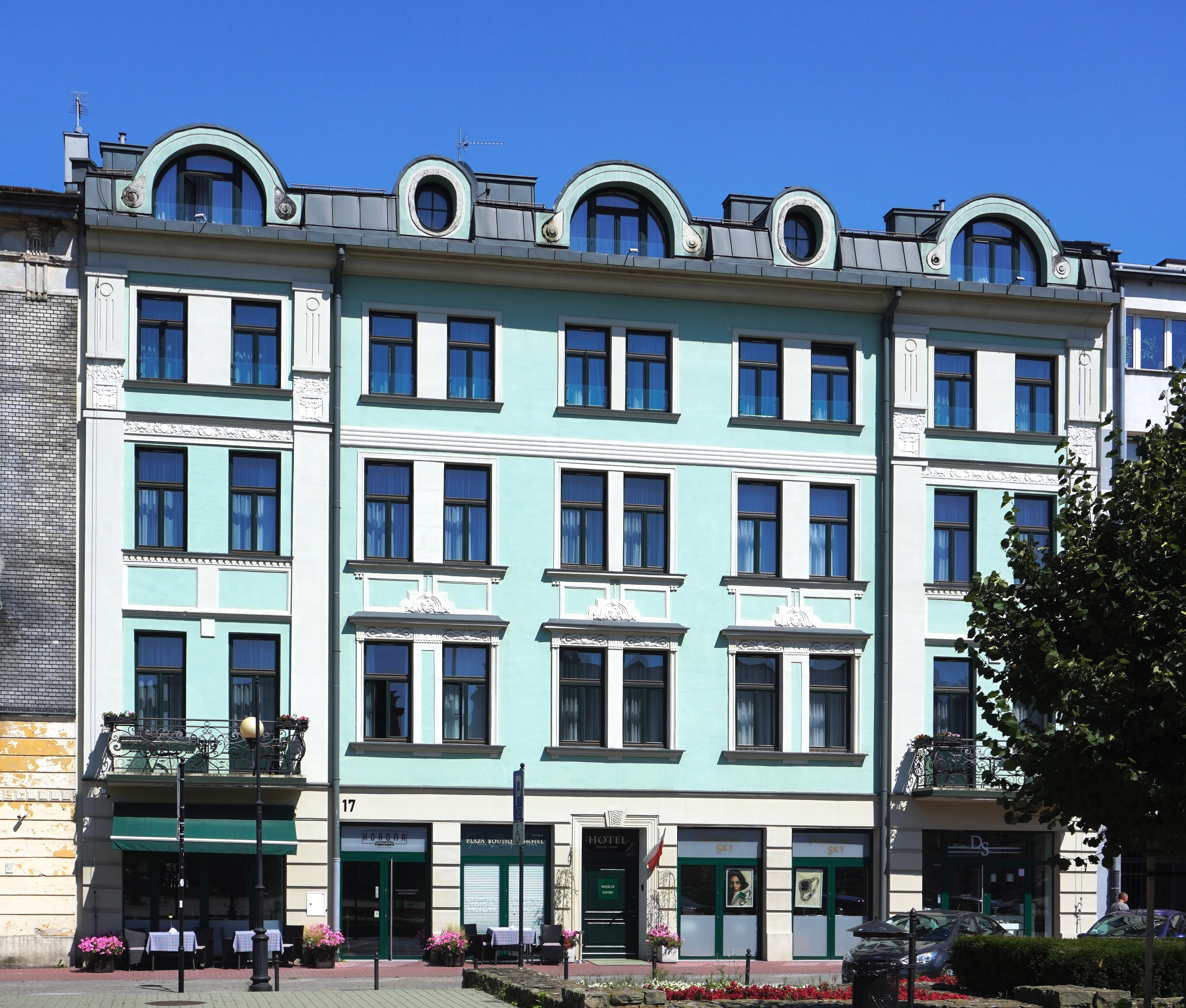
17 Legionów Józefa Piłsudskiego Street
Tenement house (1897)

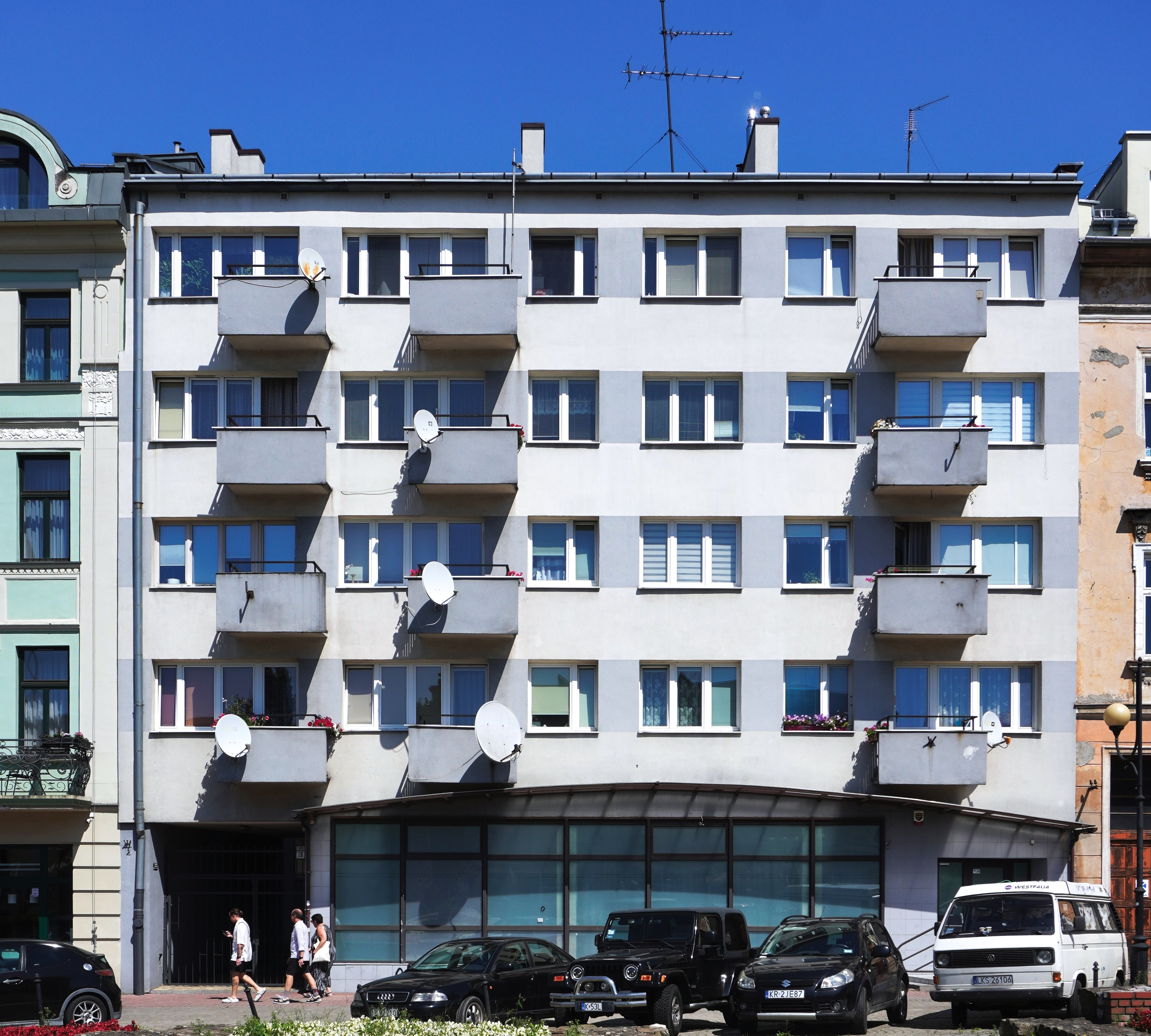
19 Legionów Józefa Piłsudskiego Street
Tenement house

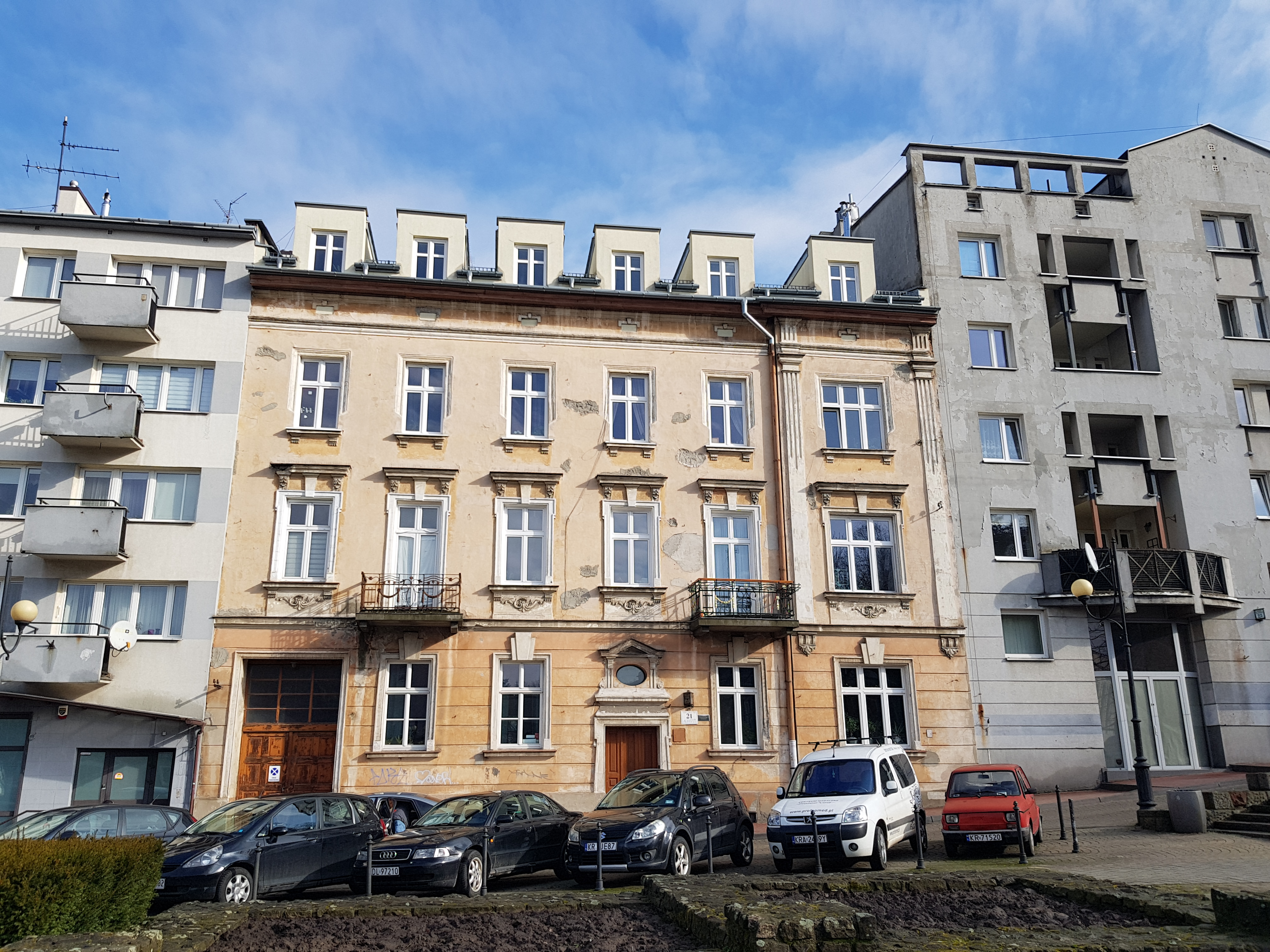
Tenement house, 21 Legionów Józefa Piłsudskiego Street (1900)
