= Kalwaryjska Street =

Street in Kraków, Poland

Kalwaryjska street
Kraków
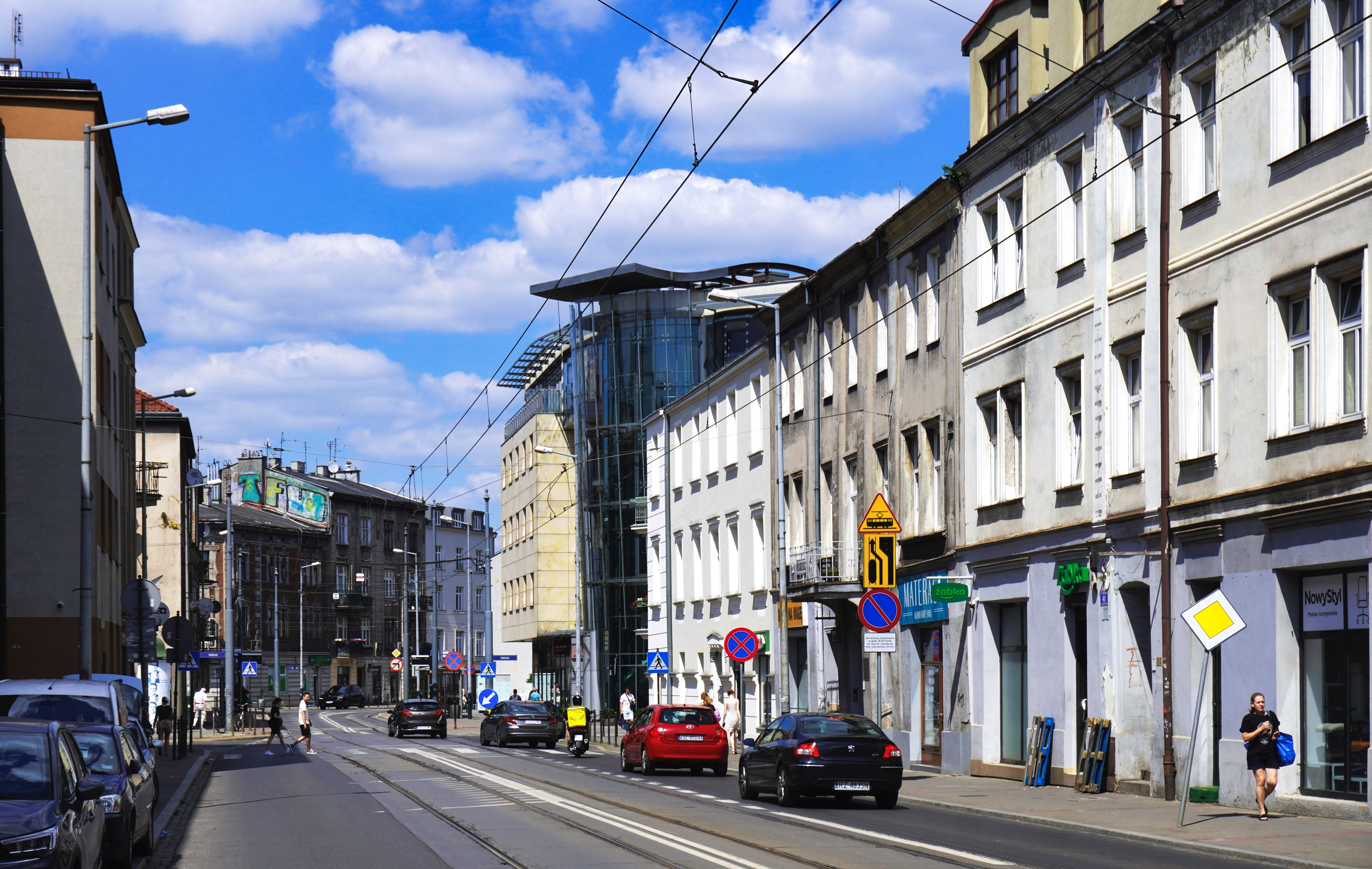
- View in the area of the intersection with Smolki Street to the north
- Interactive map of Kalwaryjska street
- Part of: Kraków Podgórze district
- Owner: City of Kraków
- Location: Kraków, Poland

Kalwaryjska Street is a street in Kraków, in District XIII Podgórze. It is the main and at the same time the oldest street in this district of the city. It runs from the Podgórski Market Square to the Antoni Mateczny Roundabout.

== History ==
The earliest section of Kalwaryjska Street – from Podgórski Market Square to the intersection with Smolki Street – was laid out between 1787 and 1789 as part of the road connecting the town of Podgórze with the route running from Lviv to Vienna. The section from the intersection with Smolki Street to Mateczny Roundabout is part of the former Hungarian Route. Development of the street began in the early 19th century on its southern side. The northern side of the road was developed in the mid-19th century after the area was drained.

=== Former Names ===
- 1789–1910 – Trakt Izdebnicki (Izdebnicki Route)
- 1910–1940 – Kalwaryjska Street
- 1940–1945 – Zakopanerstrasse
- 1945–1950 – Kalwaryjska Street
- 1950–1990 – Wincenty Pstrowski Street
- Since 1990 – Kalwaryjska Street

== Building ==
The street is primarily lined with one- and two-story tenement houses dating from 1890 to 1910.

=== Notable Buildings ===
- Tenement houses at numbers 1, 4, 17, 29, 32, and 90, designed by Stanisław Serkowski
- Tenement houses at numbers 54 and 60, designed by Józef Taborski
- K.S. Korona Hall, built between 1958 and 1960
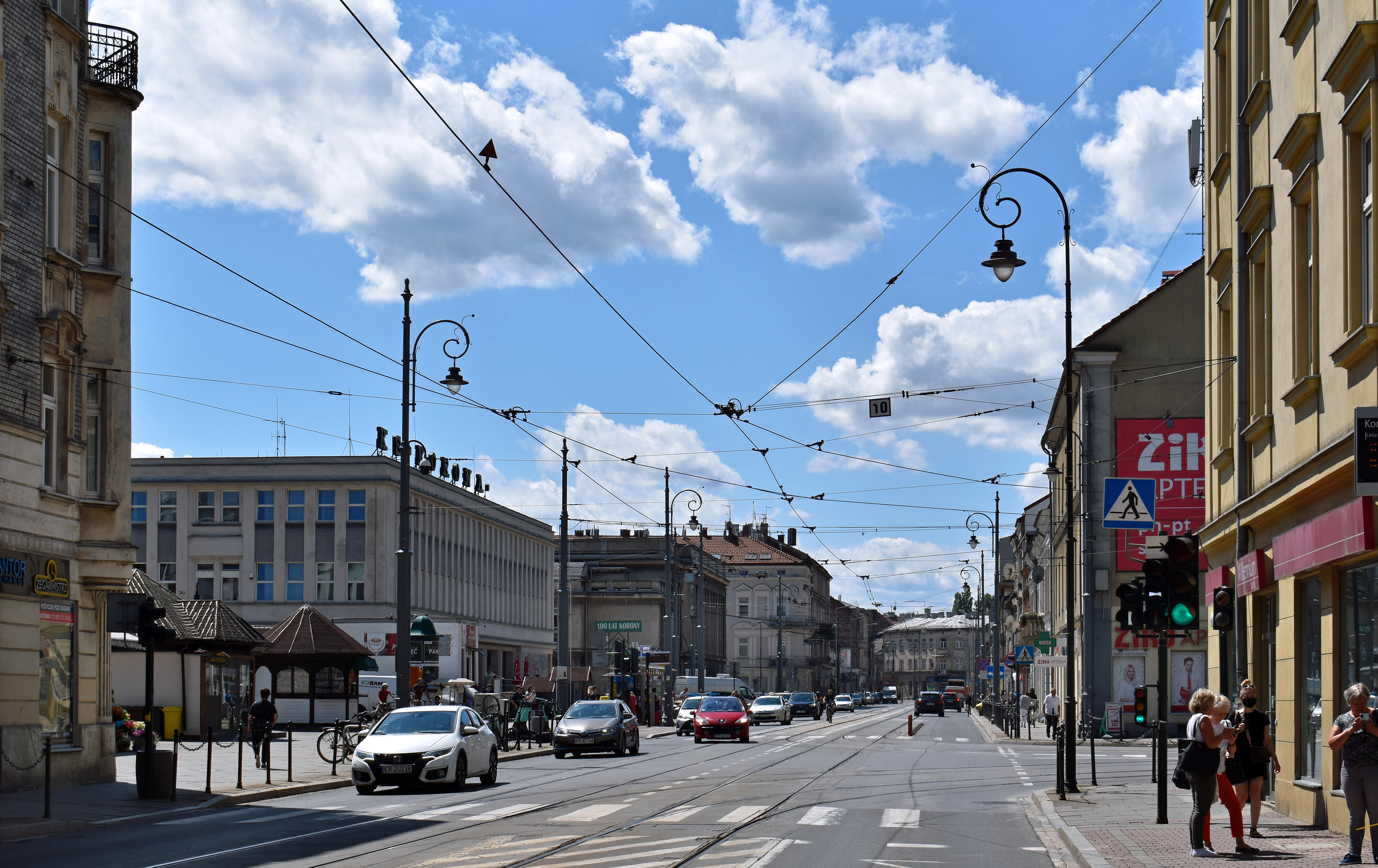
View from Podgórski Market Square looking west. Right side even numbers.

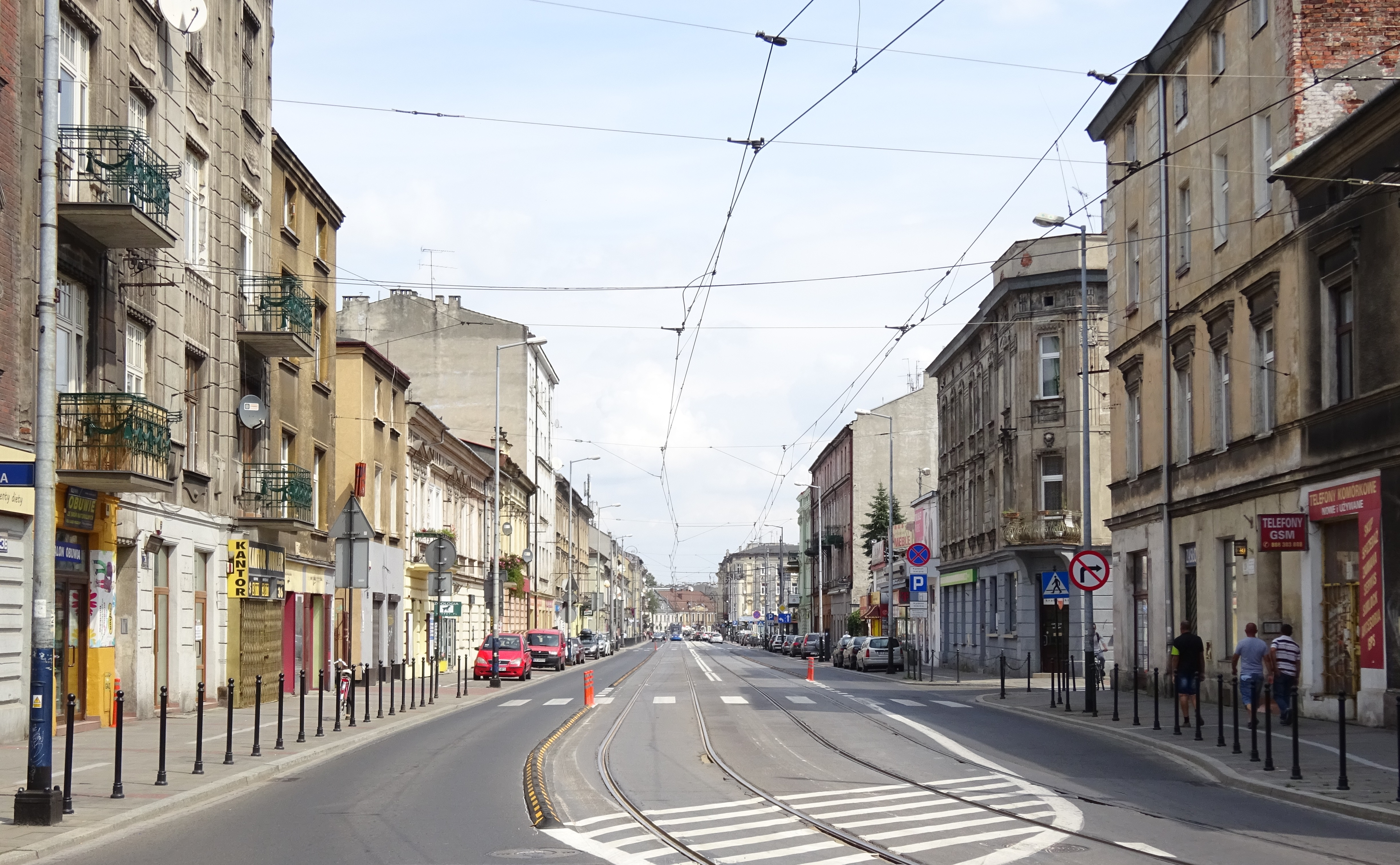
View in the area of the intersection with Jan Długosz Street to the northeast (2016).

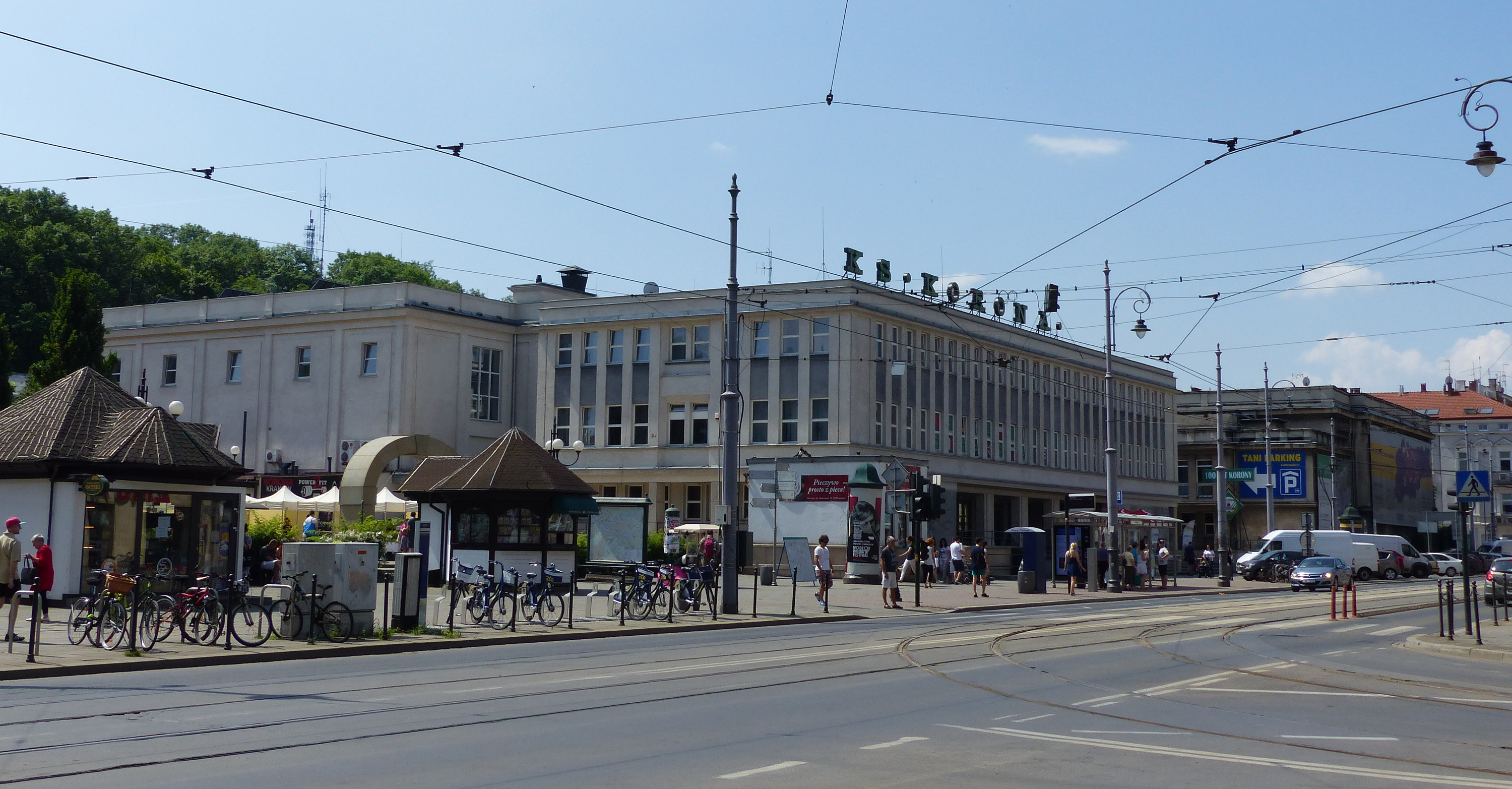
Korona Kraków hall, swimming pool and hotel,
9–15 Kalwaryjska Street

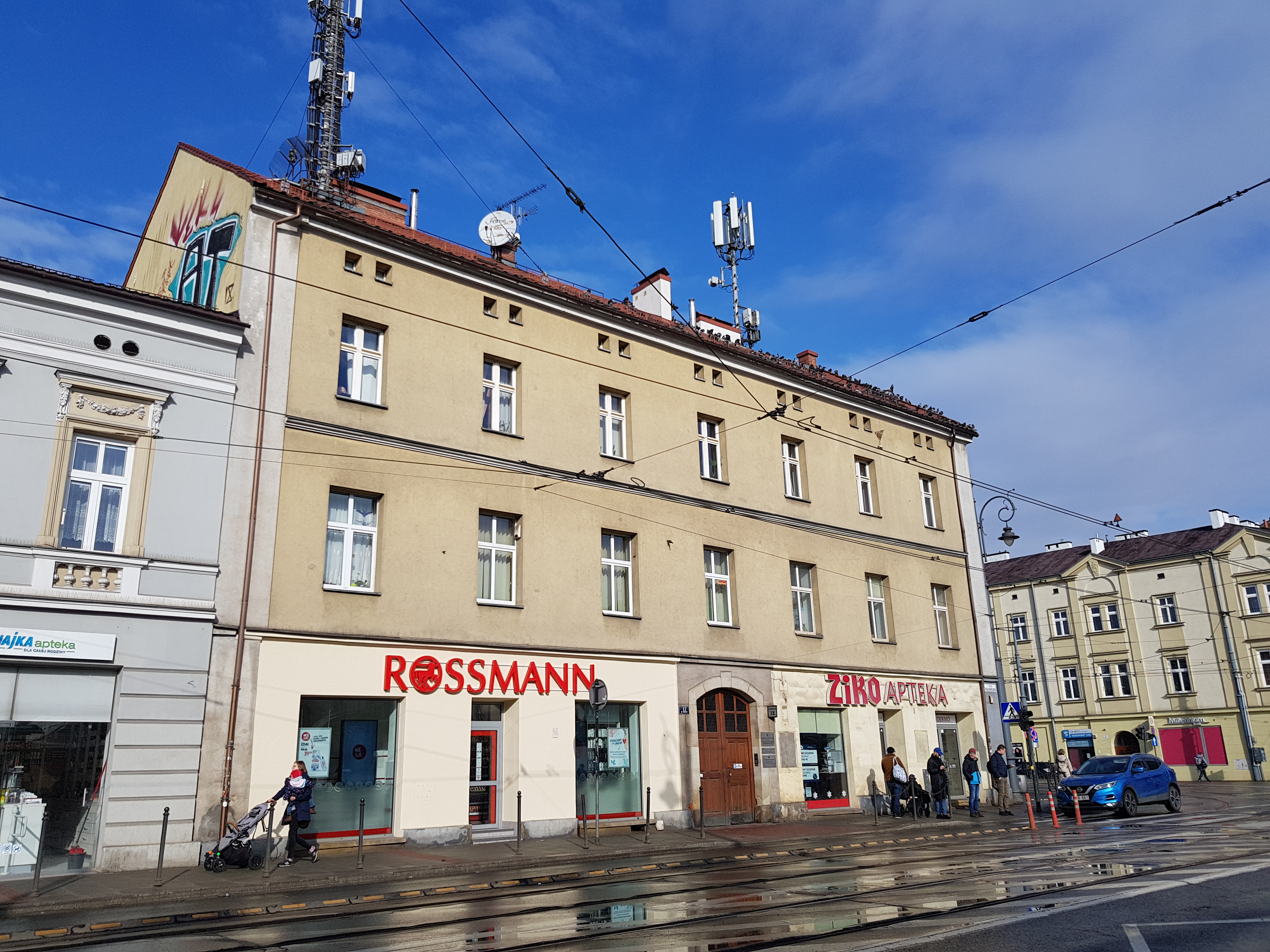
Tenement house, ul. Kalwaryjska 12

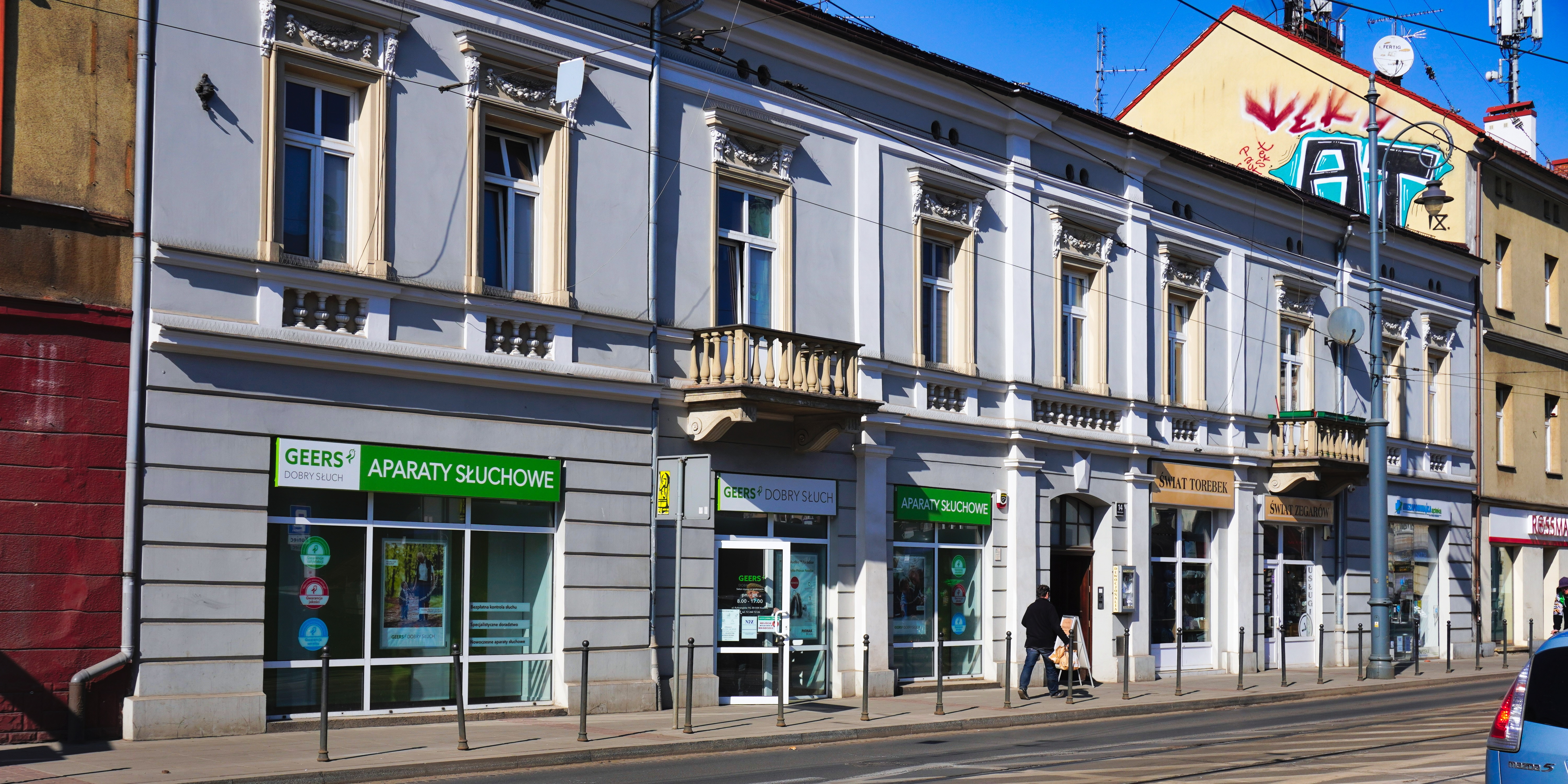
Tenement house (1890),
14 Kalwaryjska Street

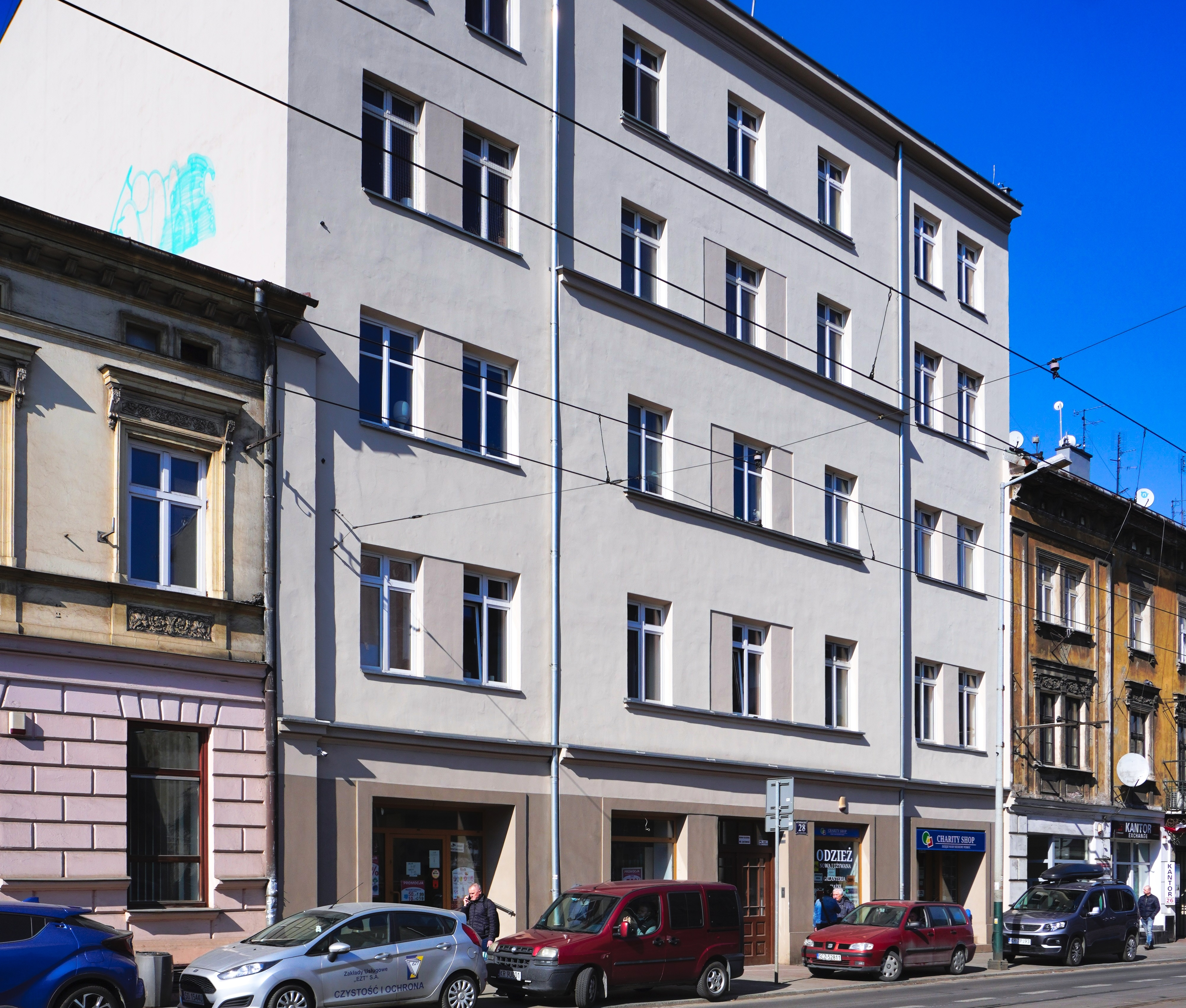
Modernist tenement house,
28 Kalwaryjska Street

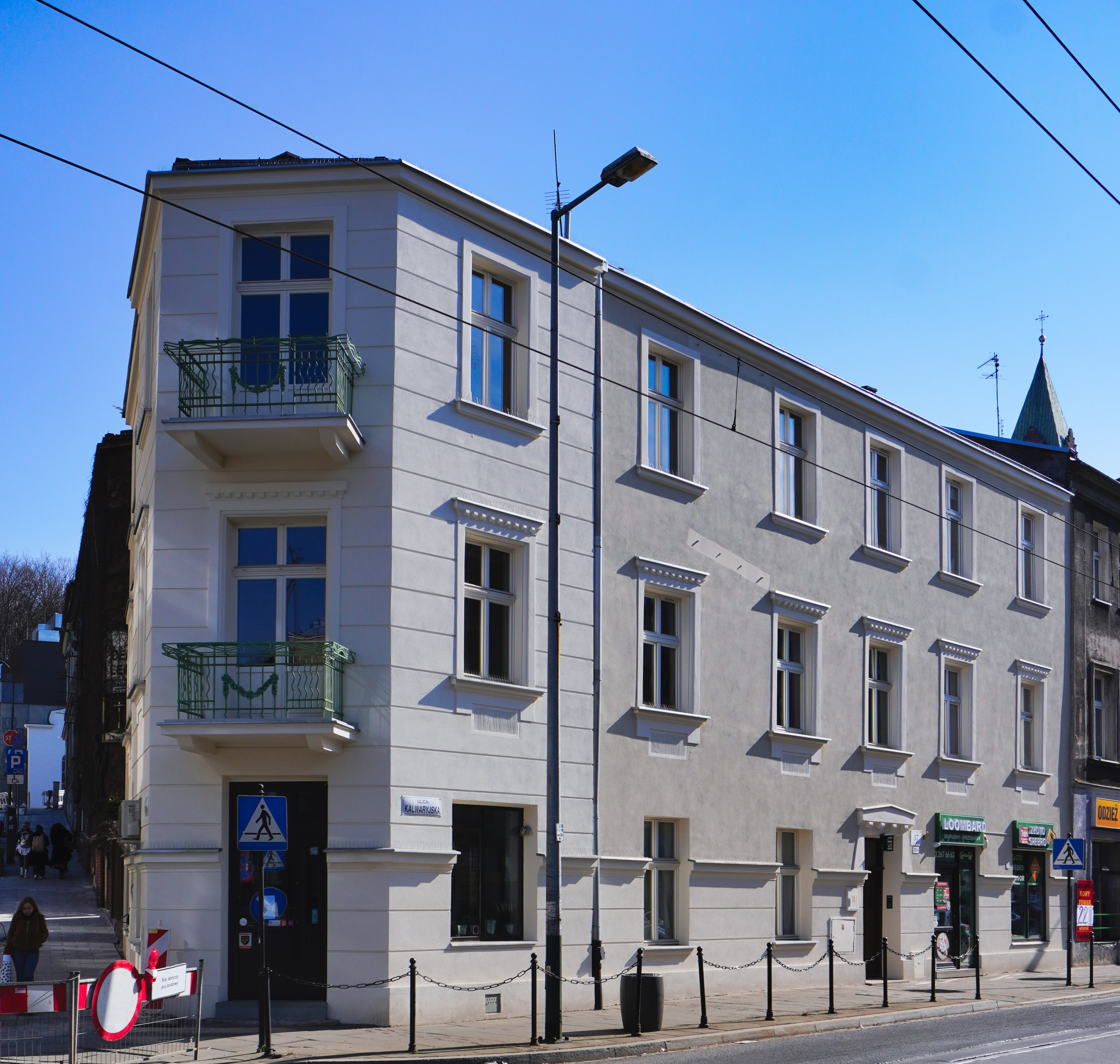
Tenement house (1910),
37 Kalwaryjska Street

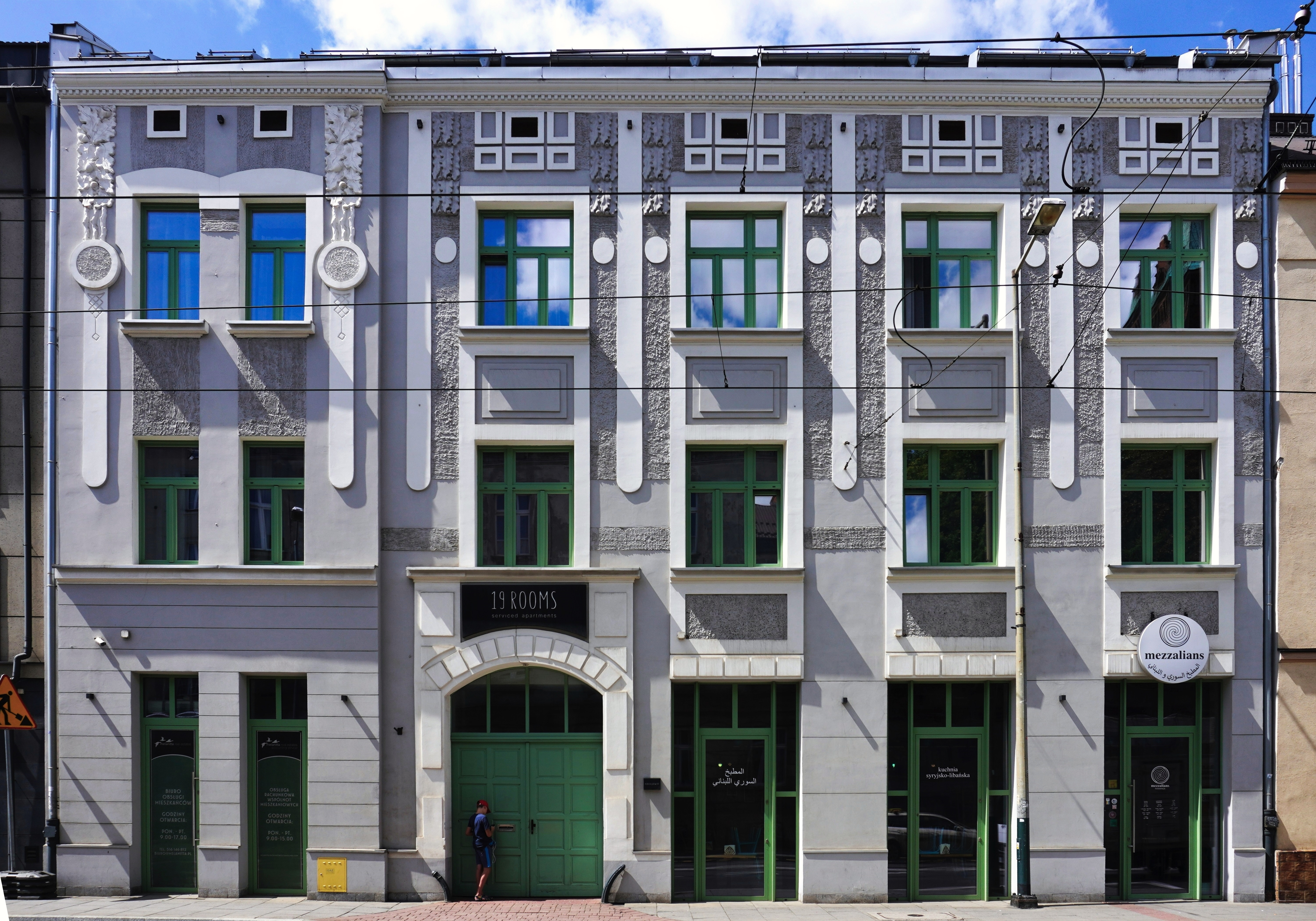
66 Kalwaryjska Street
Tenement house (design. Jan Pytel, 1911)

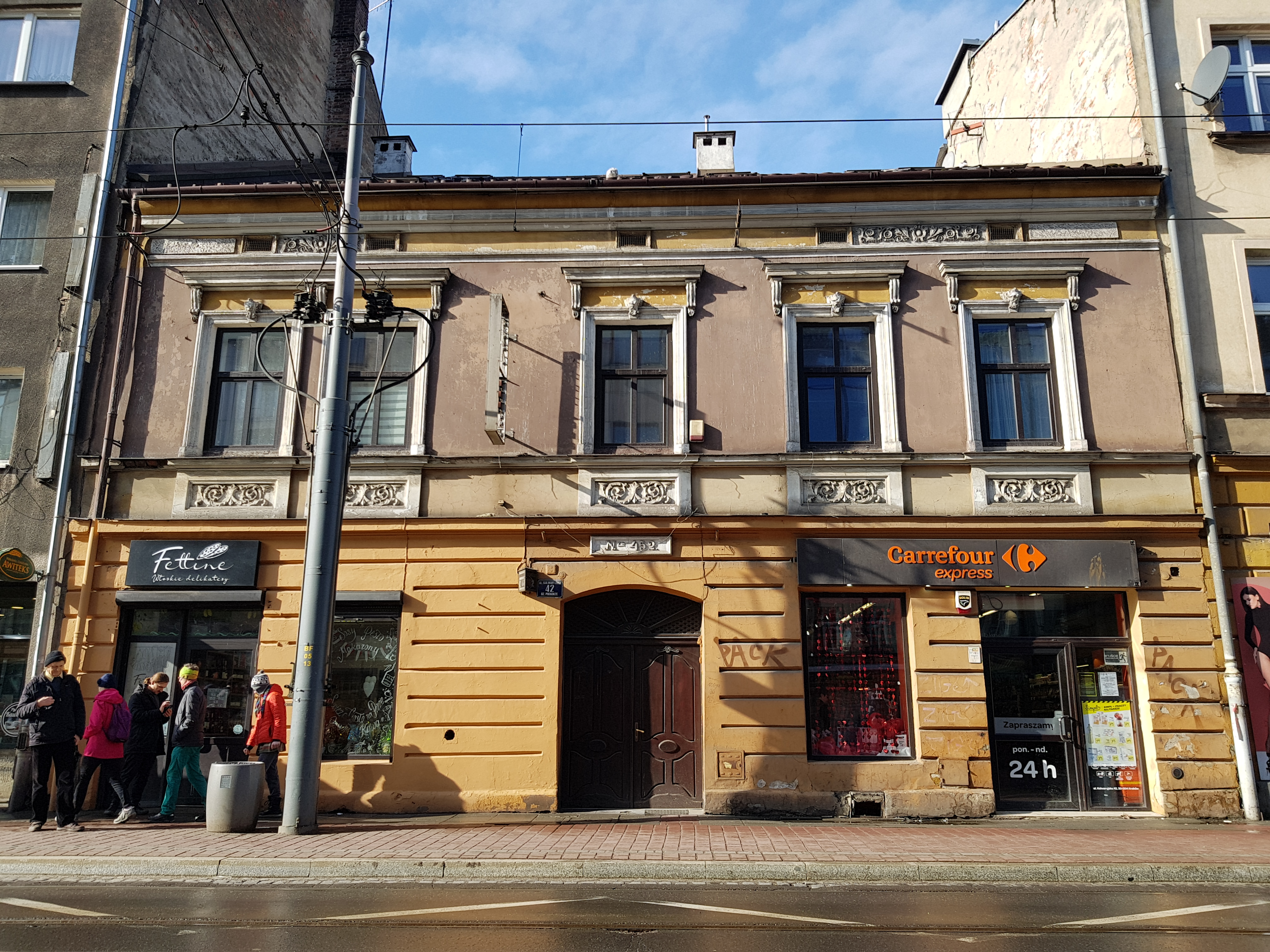
Tenement house, 42 Kalwaryjska Street

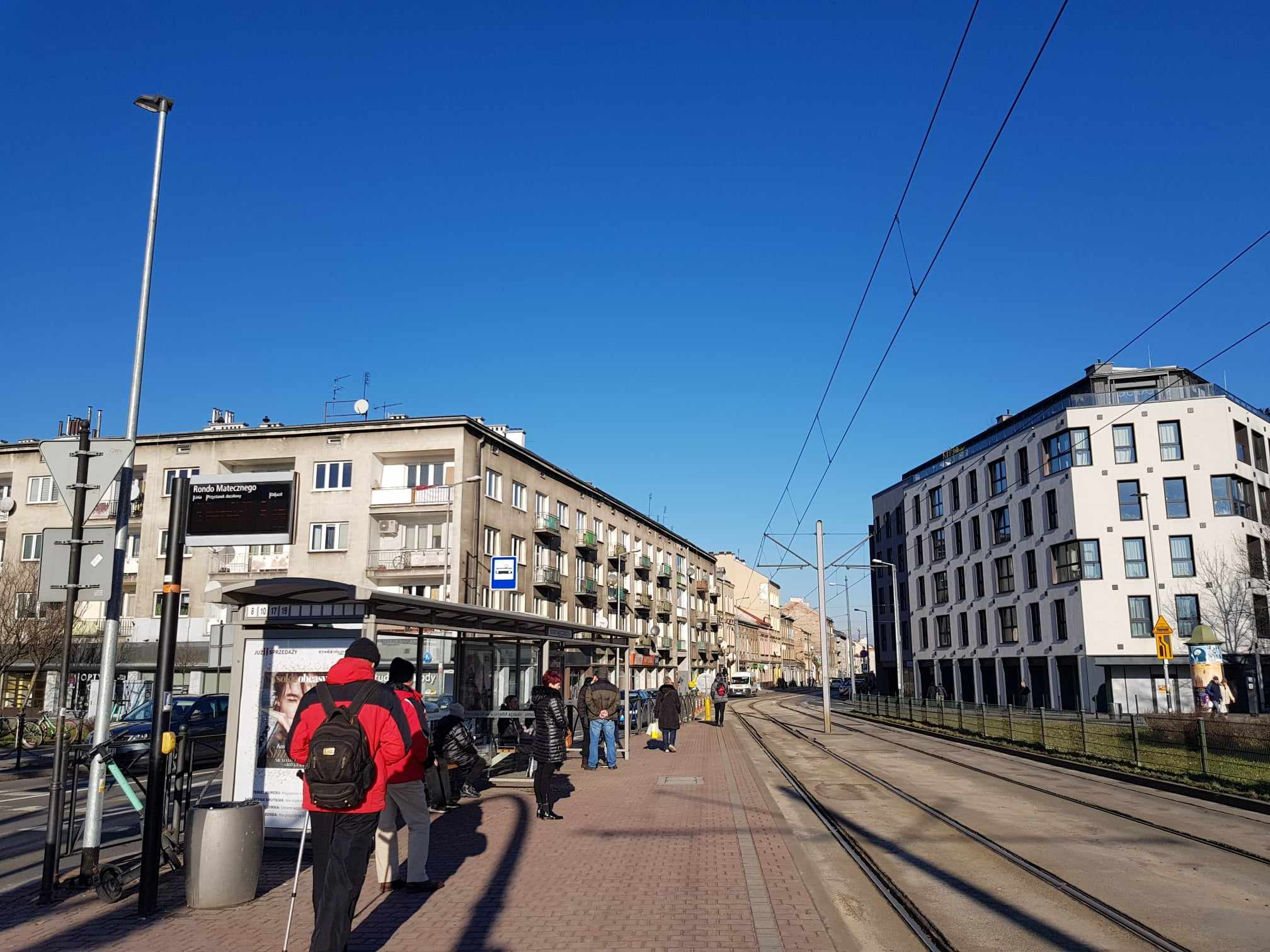
View north from Antoni Mateczny Roundabout

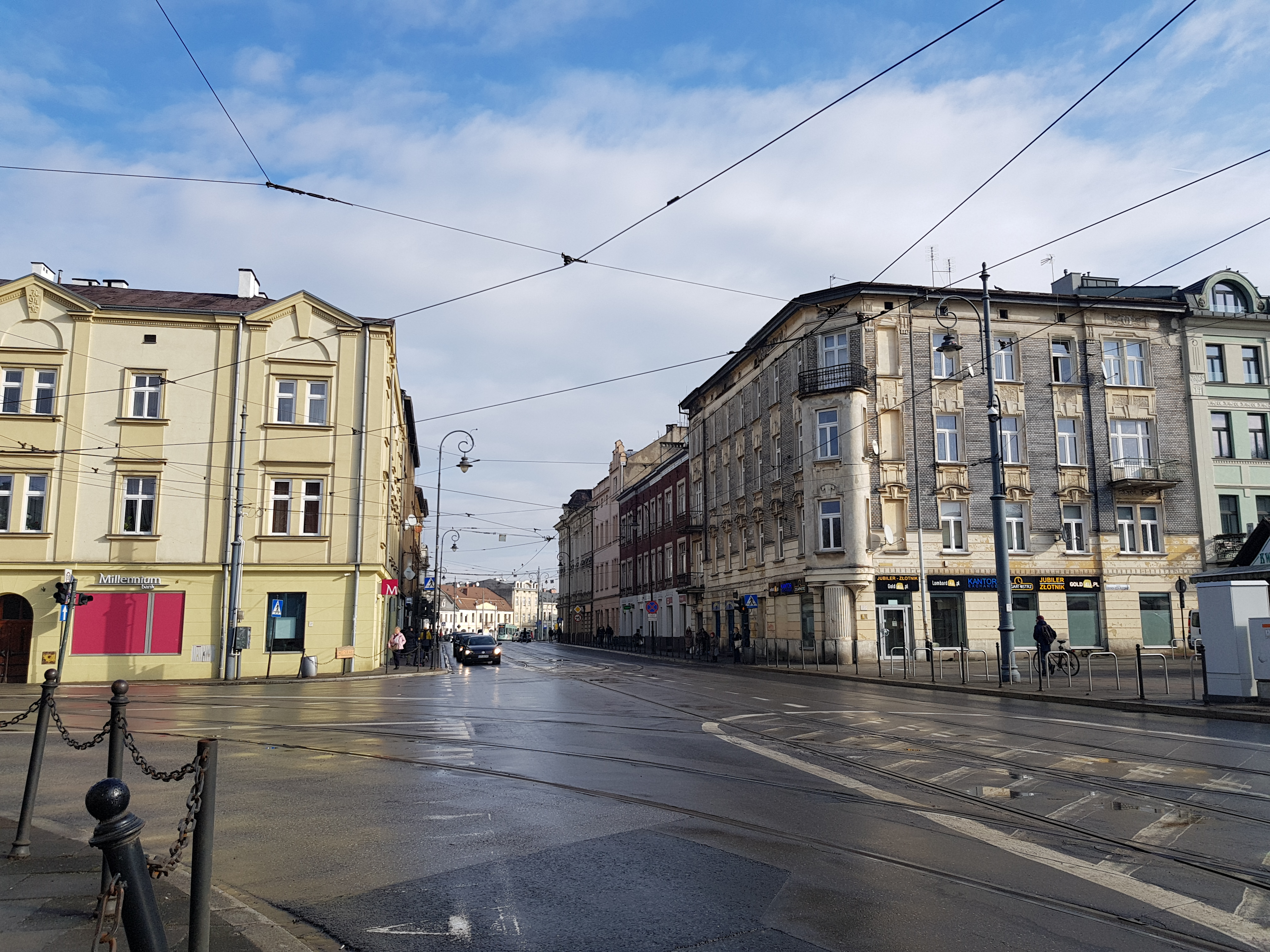
View to north east
