= Leopoldo Franciolini =

Leopoldo Franciolini (1844–1920) was an Italian antique dealer who was active in the late 19th and early 20th centuries. He is remembered as a fraudster who sold faked and altered historical musical instruments. To this day his work is a barrier to the scholarly study of instruments of the past.

== Career ==
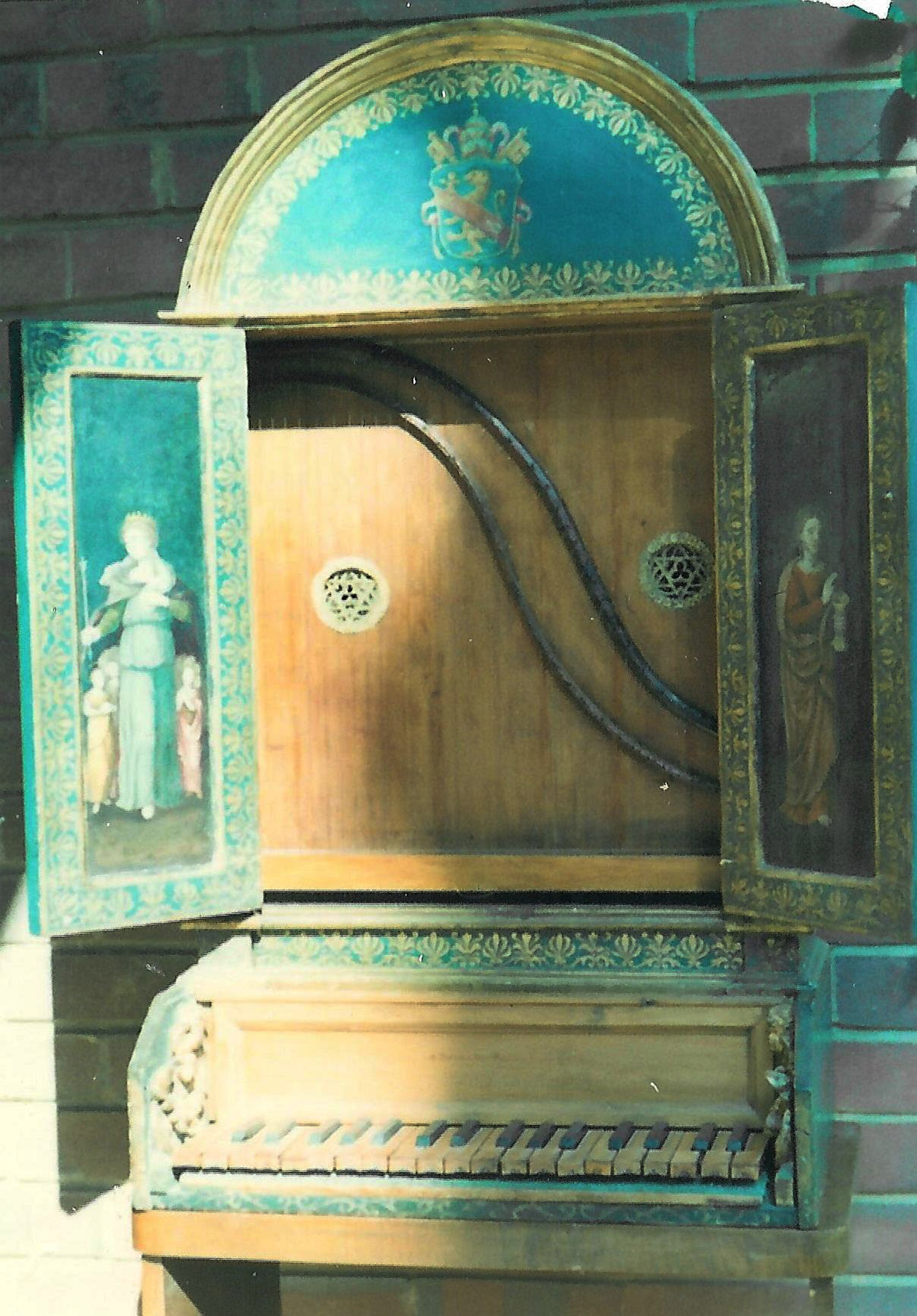
This clavicytherium, sold by Franciolini and kept in the Hans Adler Collection of Musical Instruments today, is unlike any authentically attested instrument of this kind. It formed part of the prosecution's evidence in Franciolini's criminal trial; see below.

Little is known about Franciolini's life. According to census records he was born 1 March 1844, was married in 1879, and had six children of whom one died before reaching adulthood. The census listed his occupation as organist as well as antiquary. It is possible that he founded his workshop in 1879, a date listed on his catalogs. The workshop was at various locations in Florence; during part of its existence his business was housed in more than one location.

Franciolini repeatedly sold fake instruments or instruments that were modified in his workshop to make them more appealing to naïve buyers. For instance, he added various forms of decoration, or even entire extra keyboards to harpsichords. He also attached dates to instruments to make them seem older and gave them false signatures of builders. His modifications damaged the musical value of the instruments and especially their scholarly value, making them less useful in service of modern builders, who rely on historical instruments for their design.

As Ripin notes, it will not suffice for modern scholars or buyers simply to ignore all instruments that were once in Franciolini's possession, because a great number of valuable authentic instruments passed through his shop as well. These were sometimes modified to look more like the fraudulent instruments, thus giving the latter more credibility.

=== The character of the fraudulent instruments ===
Franciolini's modifications of old instruments are often crude, involving, for instance, naive forms of decorative art, as well as misspellings of builder's names and errors in Latin mottos. Kottick points out one harpsichord in which the bridge for the added, short-scale four-foot strings is not only crude but even larger than the main bridge, an absurdity in normal harpsichord construction. At one point early in his career, Franciolini was so ignorant as to produce a keyboard in which the sharps all fell in groups of three rather than the familiar alternating twos and threes.

A specialization of Franciolini was adding extra manuals (i.e. keyboards) to old harpsichords. For instance, Franciolini concocted a total of five three-manual harpsichords, substantially outnumbering the one three-manual harpsichord known to be historically authentic. The two-manual harpsichord was rare in Italy, and Kottick suggests that for essentially any museum instrument described as an Italian two-manual, it is likely that the second manual comes from Franciolini's workshop.

=== Clientele ===
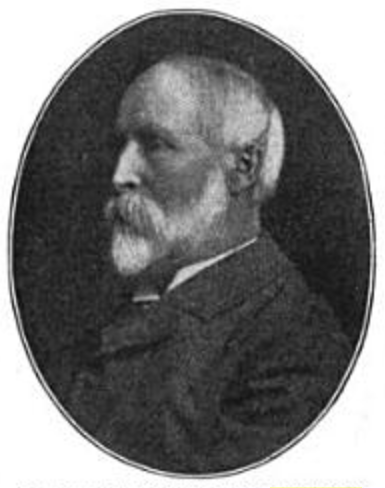
Frederick Stearns, businessman (pharmaceuticals) and collector of musical instruments, repeatedly gulled by Franciolini

Franciolini worked at a time when many of the great musical instrument collections (stored in museums today) were being built up through purchase by individual wealthy collectors. There was little published scholarship available to protect such buyers from falling victim to his frauds, and thus the collections passed on later to the museums were rife with them.

Different collectors did more or less well at detecting Franciolini's forgeries. For instance, the early music pioneer Arnold Dolmetsch, himself a builder, frequented Franciolini's shop, and easily spotted the frauds happening there. On the other hand, the American collector Frederick Stearns snapped up Franciolini items with such indiscriminate enthusiasm that a century later he was castigated by the scholars who preside over his collection in Ann Arbor today; i.e. the Stearns Collection of Musical Instruments. Describing one instrument, they write:

In this case, we have an Alto Clarinet in F. ... It is a composite instrument with four sections: two are leather-covered maple, ... the barrel appears to have been purloined from a bass clarinet ... the bell from an oboe. The mouthpiece appears to be re-purposed from a bass clarinet. ... The simultaneous crudeness and creativity demonstrated in [Franciolini's] catalogue is greatly entertaining. More troubling, however, is the shadow cast upon the flawed judgment of Frederick Stearns in his last years of collecting.

It is possible, according to Kottick, that some of Franciolini's customers didn't really care about fraud, since their interest was in early instruments as vivid decorative objects, not as scholarly artifacts. This view is also taken by the modern luthier/dealer Sinier de Ridder, who suggests moreover that Franciolini "was not the only one to offer to a rich clientele musical objects intended for decoration."

=== His arrest and prosecution ===
Franciolini prospered in his fraudulent business for many years. In 1909, however, he committed a fraud that led to his arrest. The facts are not entirely clear from the record, but Ripin offers a plausible conjecture.

According to Ripin, the source of Franciolini's legal trouble was his dealings with another sharp operator. A Count Passerini bought a large group of instruments, including fraudulent ones, from Franciolini, and resold them at a higher price to Wilhelm Heyer, an outstanding German collector in Cologne. Passerini added his own deception: he concealed the fact that he had purchased them from Franciolini, and claimed instead that the instruments had been found in a palazzo in Siena.

Heyer quickly spotted the fraudulent character of the collection. He was an astute collector, and the task of detecting Passerini's deception was not even especially difficult: some of the instruments retained labels from Franciolini's shop or were already listed in a Franciolini catalog. On ascertaining the deception Heyer returned the collection to Count Passerini, who sued Franciolini as well as filing a complaint with the state prosecutor. Brauchli writes "it is highly improbable that Franciolini, well aware of Heyer's reputation, would have tried himself to deceive Heyer so boldly."

Franciolini's trial in 1910 attracted considerable attention; it was reported in La Nazione that "a large audience composed of antiquaries, art connoisseurs, artists, etc." attended it. A court of three judges found the prosecution's evidence fully convincing and the defense's evidence fully unconvincing; and in their verdict they described some of the more vivid instances of forgery (see above) with relish.

A certain virginal, for example, ... was made from piano keys joined together in pairs and filed down and encased in such a way that they could not be able to accomplish the purpose for which they had been intended; a clavicytherium attributed to Sixtus V was nothing but a housing into which the parts of some instrument had been introduced, together with pieces of new wood hidden by a patina intended to simulate age; a small organ catalogued as being from the Empire period had pasted inside it a list of modern tunes, among which were Bellini's Norma and Sonnambula, a chitarrone said to be inlaid with ivory (according to the catalog) was instead mere celluloid; a cello attributed to Andrea Guarnieri no less and another to Della Corna of Brescia were instead no more than unskilled and patent forgeries.

Franciolini was convicted and sentenced to four months in prison. This was commuted to a fine of 1000 lire.

=== The Franciolini business in later years ===
The punishment did not deter Franciolini from further frauds; he continued operating his instrument-forgery business in the remaining years of his life. Heyer may have attempted to alert other collectors to Franciolini's activities; an anonymous article appeared in the German-language organological journal Zeitschrift für Instrumentenbau reporting the Passerini episode from Heyer's own point of view, and according to Ripin this did help prevent some collectors from being taken in. But outside German-speaking countries, there were still plenty of customers who didn't know about Franciolini's conviction, so it was still possible to some degree for him to continue business as usual.

A particularly brazen sale appears to have taken place in 1911. As the Zeitschrift für Instrumentenbau reported, Franciolini's son Luigi traveled to London with his brother-in-law, bringing a set of instruments purporting to be from the estate of the senior Franciolini, whom they claimed to have died. Among their instruments was a fake three-manual harpsichord derived from a 1627 single-manual by Stefano Bolcioni. It appears that the Franciolinis had redecorated it, so that it would no longer match the sales photograph they had circulated earlier. The instrument probably was successfully sold at the time; it eventually made its way to the Russell Collection in Edinburgh.

Franciolini really did die in 1920 (10 February, of bronchial pneumonia), but the business still continued under the direction of his sons. However, Ripin notes (p. xv) that by then "the halcyon days were over. The large-scale and frequently indiscriminate collecting of Italian works of art that characterized the late 19th century and early years of the 20th came to an end with a gradual increase in the expertise of museum curators and private collectors alike." The Franciolini family business gradually wound down, and at least one of his sons found a new occupation.

== Coping with Franciolini frauds in modern times ==
=== Museums and curators ===
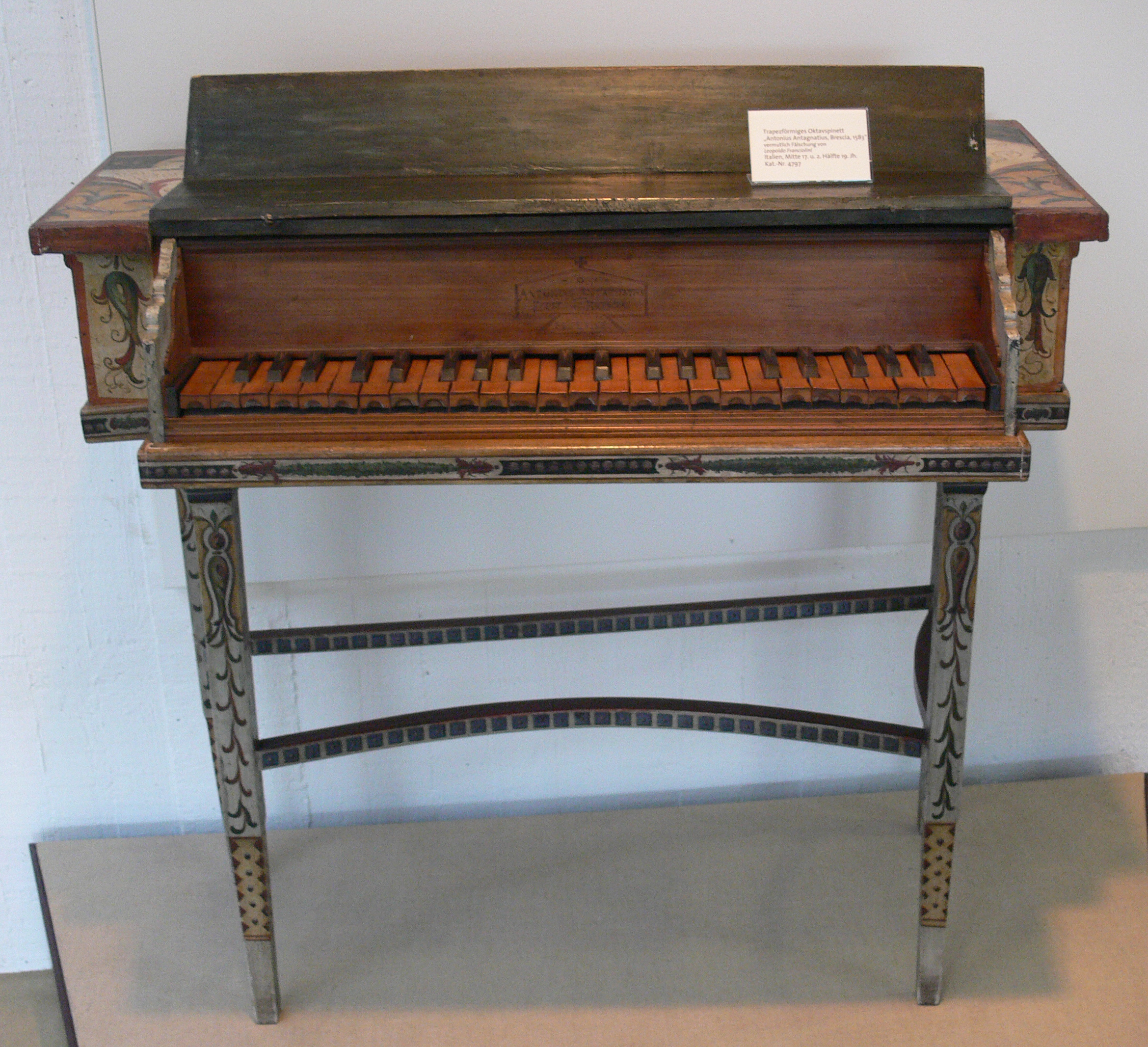
An ottavino (tiny harpsichord, one octave higher in pitch than standard) thought to be a Franciolini fabrication. See main text for details.

Various modern museum curators have taken pains to publicly identify items in their collections known to be Franciolini frauds. For example, the Stearns Collection, noted above, scrupulously notifies its patrons on its website and gallery entrance that many of the instruments it owns are Franciolini items. The curators of the Musical Instrument Museum in Berlin say of the ottavino displayed at right, "trapezoid ottavino, described as 'Antonius Antagnatius, Brescia, 1583' (probably a forgery by Leopoldo Franciolini). Italy, mid 17th century and second half of 19th century."

The curators at the Hans Adler Memorial Collection in South Africa give "equal time" to Franciolini, mentioning his own attribution for the clavicytherium described above, but also mentioning its appearance in the story of Franciolini's criminal prosecution.

The website of Germanisches Nationalmuseum in Nuremberg, Germany lists a three-manual harpsichord with the inscription as "Bartholomeo Christofari Patavinus fecit Florentiae 1703"; i.e. Bartolomeo Cristofori, but mentioning that this inscription is false, that the instrument is based on an English pianoforte, and that it has been produced in the 19th century. More generally, instrument scholar Laurence Libin has written, "Franciolini['s] products are all too common yet sometimes unacknowledged."

Most large musical instrument museums lack the gallery space needed to display all of their instruments in public. Curators have sometimes responded to the realization that an instrument is a Franciolini fraud by shifting it from the public galleries into storage. Thus, a visually spectacular three-manual harpsichord from Franciolini's shop was long a prominent item displayed in the musical instrument gallery of the Deutsches Museum in Munich but is no longer viewable. None of the 14 Franciolini-derived instruments in the Metropolitan Museum of Art in New York is on public view, nor were (as of 2014) any of the 38 Franciolini items listed on the web site of the Stearns collection.

Another option a museum can take to deal with its Franciolini instruments is to deaccession them; i.e. remove them from the collection. One example is a three-manual harpsichord that Franciolini sold in 1900 to the great collector Mary Elizabeth Brown, who installed it in her closely affiliated collection at the Metropolitan Museum. This harpsichord was rebuilt in Franciolini's workshop from a 1789 fortepiano by the Italian builder Vincenzio Sodi. The Metropolitan Museum sold it in 1983 to John Koster (a noted harpsichord scholar) and Jacqueline Block, who later donated it (2008) to the National Music Museum in Vermillion, South Dakota, where it resides today.

=== Scholars ===
The musical instrument scholar Edwin Ripin helped to clean up the scholarly mess Franciolini created by publishing an edition of Franciolini's own sales catalogs (Ripin 1974, cited below). Brauchli (1998) writes that thanks to Ripin's research and publication, "most of the altered and fraudulent instruments in museums and collections throughout the world have now been identified." This may be optimistic; Kottick and Lucktenberg (1997)'s survey of musical instrument museums contains multiple references to instruments that are likely – not certain – to be Franciolini material. And even when an instrument is known to have passed through Franciolini's hands, doubt can remain about the degree of falsification it underwent. For instance, the following description appears on the web site of the Stearns Collection in Ann Arbor (catalogue #1333):

This harpsichord features an inscription of “Christoforus Rigunini, Firenze, A.D. 1602,” which, if true, makes it one of the oldest keyboards in the Stearns Collection. It comes to us, however, through the nefarious instrument dealer, Leopoldo Franciolini. One could say that it is the only surviving instrument ever crafted by the maker Rigunini, however, given that not a single person by the name of Rigunini ever seems to have drawn breath, we might assume that Franciolini invented the name and forged the date. When John Koster examined the instrument in 2006, however, he wrote, “The original single-strung disposition, seldom made after the early seventeenth century, would suggest a relatively early date for the instrument.”

The Franciolini-altered instruments offer an interesting challenge and indeed enjoyment to modern scholars – harpsichord expert Denzil Wraight has said that "unravelling the tangle of Franciolini forgeries provides some harmless amusement." Wraight's remark comes from a scholarly article in which he reasons his way to the conclusion that the three-manual harpsichord in the Deutsches Museum, attributed by Franciolini to Bartolomeo Cristofori, was in fact originally a single-manual instrument built in 1658 by Girolamo Zenti. The three-manual harpsichord in the National Music Museum (described above) was studied in detail by John Koster during the time it was in his possession. Koster's attribution of the instrument to Sodi was not difficult since Franciolini had neglected to obliterate the signature Sodi placed on a soundboard rib. Koster's scholarly paper on this instrument (1999) focuses instead on what knowledge can be retrieved about the original Sodi fortepiano from the converted harpsichord. Similar detective work has been carried out by Grant O'Brien on the three-manual Franciolini-altered Bolcioni instrument in the Russell Collection in Edinburgh, mentioned above.

=== Dealers and auction houses ===
A modern auction house that values its trustworthy reputation must sell an old Franciolini instrument with circumspection. Thus, when the Christie's auction house offered a theorbo tainted by a possible Franciolini provenance, it noted the Franciolini origin in all capitals on its website, and set the opening bid price very low (the final selling price was also low). Sotheby's, selling a Franciolini virginals, likewise provided ample warning and set a low estimated price.
