= Socolow =

Socolow is a surname. Notable people with the surname include:

- Elizabeth Socolow (born 1940), American poet, wife of Robert H. Socolow
- Frank Socolow (1923–1981), American jazz musician
- Michael J. Socolow (born 1968), American journalist and historian, son of Sanford Socolow
- Robert H. Socolow (born 1937), American physicist, husband of Elizabeth Socolow
- Sanford Socolow (1928–2015), American journalist, father of Michael J. Socolow
