= Stearns Collection of Musical Instruments =

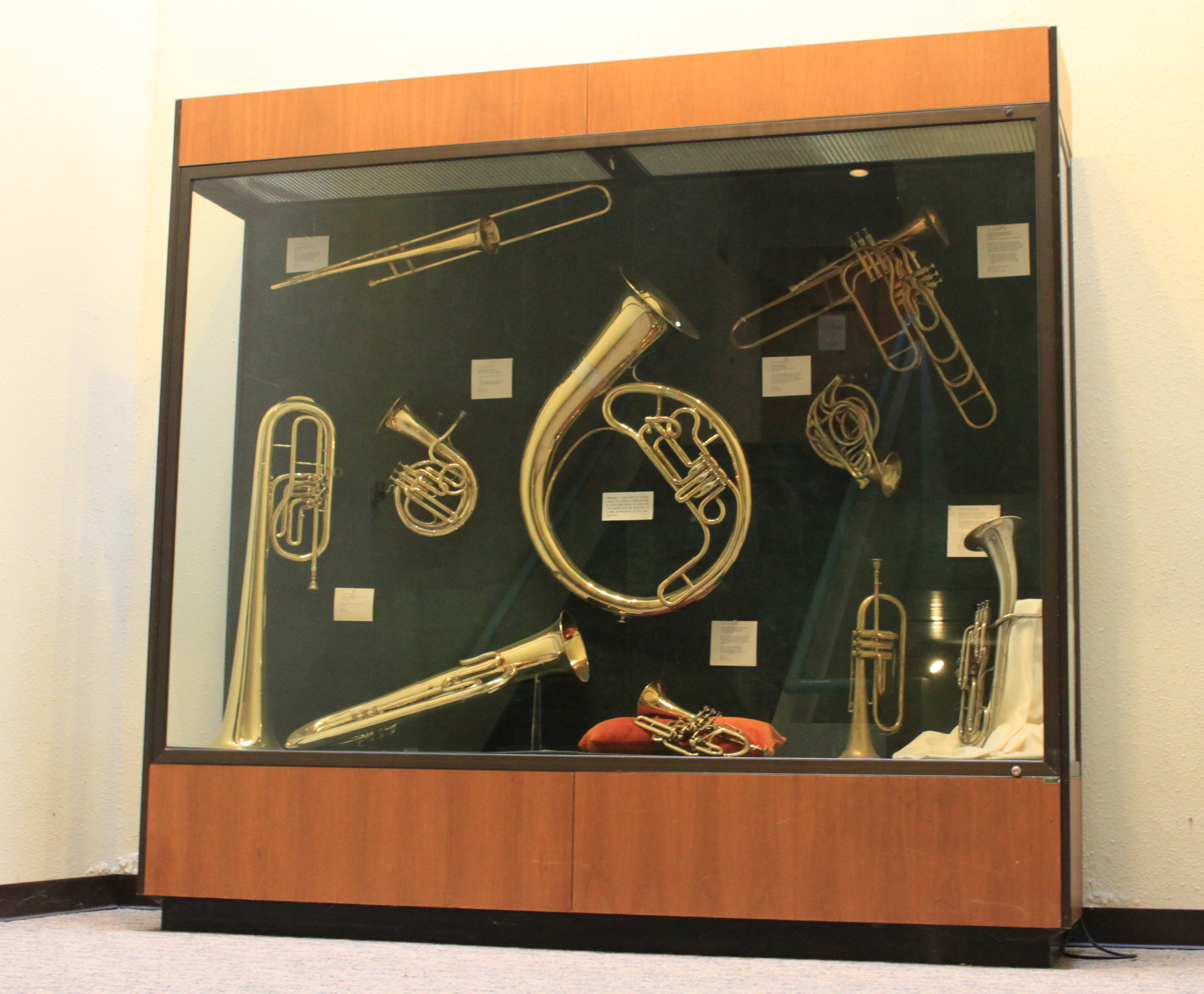
- Stearns Collection display in the UMich School of Music, Dance & Theatre's; Earl V. Moore Building.
- Established: 1898 by Frederick Stearns
- Director: Joseph Gascho
- Staff: Katie Sucha, program manager Carol Stepanchuk, outreach and lecture series director
- Location: Ann Arbor, Michigan, United States; 42°17′25.1″N 83°43′15.6″W
- Website: smtd.umich.edu

The Stearns Collection of Musical Instruments, held by the University of Michigan's School of Music, Theatre, and Dance in Ann Arbor, Michigan, consists of nearly 3000 historical and contemporary musical instruments from around the world. The basis of the Collection is a gift made to the university by pharmaceutical businessman Frederick Stearns in 1898. Known internationally as a unique research collection, its holdings include the trumpet collection of Armando Ghitalla, former principal trumpet player of the Boston Symphony Orchestra and University of Michigan faculty member; a collection of violin bows from Jerry Tetewsky; as well as Robert Moog's first commercially produced Moog synthesizer from 1964 and the RCA theremin used during the WXYZ broadcasts of the Green Hornet from 1936 to 1952. A catalog documenting the Collection's holdings was published in 1918 by Albert A. Stanley, with a second edition published in 1921. In 1988, Professor James M. Borders published a catalog featuring the Collection's European and American wind and percussion instruments.

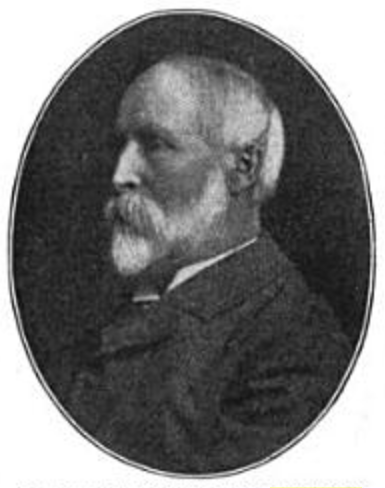
Frederick Stearns, industrialist (pharmaceuticals) and founder of the collection

The museum's collections include a number of forged or altered items, purchased by the founder from the notorious Italian instrument dealer Leopoldo Franciolini. The museum's web site and signage are unusual among musical instrument museums for the scrupulous care with which these items are identified.

The collection is housed at the North Campus Research Complex and maintains exhibits in the lower lobby of the university's Hill Auditorium on the Central Campus and at the Earl V. Moore Building on the North Campus.

== See also ==
- List of music museums
