= Op-ed =

Type of opinion-expressing written pieces

An op-ed (short for "opposite the editorial page"), a type of opinion journalism, is written prose that expresses a strong, focused opinion on an issue of relevance to the target audience and is commonly found in newspapers, magazines, and online publications. Typically ranging from 500 to 700 words, op-eds are distinct from articles written by the publication's editorial board and often feature the opinions of outside contributors.

Op-eds allow authors who are not part of the publication's editorial team to express opinions, perspectives, and arguments on various issues of public interest. Unlike traditional editorials, which reflect the opinion of the publication itself, op-eds offer independent voices a foundation to influence public discourse. The New York Times is widely credited with popularizing the modern op-ed format.

== Origin ==
The "Page Op.", created in 1921 by Herbert Bayard Swope of The New York Evening World, is a possible precursor to the modern op-ed. When Swope took over as main editor in 1920, he opted to designate a page from editorial staff as "a catchall for book reviews, society boilerplate, and obituaries". Swope explained:

It occurred to me that nothing is more interesting than opinion when opinion is interesting, so I devised a method of cleaning off the page opposite the editorial, which became the most important in America ... and thereon I decided to print opinions, ignoring facts.

The modern op-ed page was formally developed in 1970 under the direction of The New York Times editor John B. Oakes. Media scholar Michael J. Socolow writes of Oakes' innovation:

The Times' effort synthesized various antecedents and editorial visions. Journalistic innovation is usually complex and typically involves multiple external factors. The Times op-ed page appeared in an era of democratizing cultural and political discourse and economic distress for the company itself.

The newspaper's executives developed a place for outside contributors, with space reserved for sale at a premium rate for additional commentaries and other purposes.

The Washington Post too published its own version of the op-ed right before The New York Times debuted in September 1970. Significant differences between The Post's op-ed page and The Times's op-ed page include The Washington Post having no ads and no artistic component. In the 1930s, The Washington Post began referring to its commentary section as the "op-ed page", situated opposite its editorial page. The Los Angeles Times followed suit with a similar designation in the 1950s and 1960s, while The Chicago Tribune had tried a variation of this format as early as 1912. That is to say that while we credit Oakes as the creator of the op-ed, the true origins of the op-ed are highly debated in the journalistic sphere.

== Culture ==
With the development and availability of radio and television broadcasting as major information outlets, stakeholders and print journalism workers sought to increase or maintain their audience and relevance. Major newspapers such as The New York Times and The Washington Post began including more opinionated journalism, adding more columns, and increasing the extent of their opinion pages to drive public participation and readership.

This was exacerbated by the period, as world events like World War I, World War II, the Vietnam War, the Korean War, and major cultural changes began to make the public restless. Editors wanted to keep up readership as newspapers began to go out of business; they also needed to find new ways to compete with the versatility of television and radio, which started to become commonplace in people's homes. On the other hand, the general public wanted to have multiple points of view, as this time was also marked by a wave of liberalism, including the fight for gender equality and the civil rights movement.

== Structure and features ==
Op-eds feature a concise structure, with an average of under 700 words, and typically begin with an introduction. They begin with a hook to engage readers, usually something outlandish or exaggerated for the shock factor. Then the author usually ties the intro together with a story related to them or an experience they had. Following this is the body, which has a tone that is usually persuasive and conversational, often divided into three or four sections, each presenting evidence or arguments supporting the thesis. They then tie the op-ed together with a conclusion or closing statement where a call to action is made.

Op-eds are written by a wide range of authors, including journalists, academics, politicians, and activists. Publications invite guest contributors to present various viewpoints, despite the viewpoints often being contradictory to the editorial's position on certain topics. Today, op-eds are widely read across both traditional and digital platforms, and writers range from academics and activists to politicians and celebrities.

The op-ed is known for the diverse opinions of its columnists and can include media in a variety of forms including:

- Seminar
- Essays
- Poetry
- Political cartoon
- Advertisements
- Speeches
- Blog post

== Rhetoric ==
Op-eds are written to persuade, inform, or incite public debate, with rhetoric playing a vital role in achieving these goals. Contributors invited to write an op-ed for an editorial commonly use appeals to ethos (credibility), pathos (emotion), and logos (logic) to structure their arguments and connect with readers.

1. Ethos: Contributors often establish their credentials early to build credibility. For instance, a climate scientist's op-ed on climate change would typically begin with a brief mention of the author's background to emphasize their authority on the subject.
2. Pathos: An emotional appeal is also a common tactic, with authors evoking sympathy, anger, or hope in order to drive people to action.
3. Logos: Logical appeals are also achieved through well-reasoned arguments and evidence. Authors often use statistics, historical examples, and real-world scenarios to make their case compelling and hard to ignore.

== In different media ==
With the rise of digital platforms, op-eds have expanded beyond traditional print media. Online publications and blogs have become popular, and social media plays a significant role in disseminating and engaging with op-ed content. Additionally, op-eds are increasingly presented in audio and video formats, reaching audiences through podcasts and video essays. The internet and social media have further evolved the op-ed format. Platforms like HuffPost, Medium, and Substack allow virtually anyone to publish opinion pieces, which have been conflated with the op-ed to the point where the terms have become interchangeable. While they have always had a significant impact on public opinion, the digital age has allowed op-eds to influence the public more broadly and almost instantaneously.

== Evolution of terminology ==
In April 2021, New York Times opinion editor Kathleen Kingsbury announced the retirement of the term "op-ed" in favor of the more precise term "guest essay". The main reason was that in the modern digital world in which millions of readers only read the Times online, it no longer made sense to speak of an article running "opposite the editorial page". In Kingsbury's words: "It is a relic of an older age and an older print newspaper design".

== Popular op-eds ==
- "I Am Part of the Resistance Inside the Trump Administration" (2018) - The New York Times: Written by an anonymous senior official in the first Trump administration, this op-ed created a significant public response by claiming that some within the administration were actively working to subvert certain presidential directives.
- "Can America Prevent Russia from Using Low-Yield Nukes" (2018) - The Buzz: Written by author Mark B. Schneider, a senior analyst with the National Institute for PublicPolicy. This op-ed advises the U.S. to deploy low-yield nuclear warheads on submarines to counter Russia's strategy of using limited nuclear strikes for coercive advantage in conventional conflicts.
- "How Will the Mideast Bloodshed End? Not With a Bullet" (2024) - Los Angeles Times: Written by LZ Granderson, this article discusses the limitations of military solutions in the Middle East, emphasizing the need for humanitarian aid and diplomatic efforts to address the root causes of conflict and instability in Gaza and Lebanon.

== Possible conflicts of interest ==
The relationship between op-eds, editors, and funding from interest groups has been a concern. In 2011, in an open letter to The New York Times, a group of U.S. journalists and academics called for conflict-of-interest transparency in op-eds. Critics of op-ed journalism argue that it can oversimplify complex issues and may introduce bias, especially when written by people affiliated with powerful interest groups, corporations, or political entities. They argue that op-eds can become tools for misinformation, especially in today's highly polarized media environment, due to the lack of rigorous editorial oversight.

== See also ==
- Feuilleton
- Pundit
- Letter to the editor
