= Sanford Socolow =

American journalist

Sanford Socolow (November 11, 1928 – January 31, 2015) was an American broadcast journalist who worked at CBS News from 1956 to 1988. He was executive producer of The CBS Evening News with Walter Cronkite from 1978 to 1981.

== Early life ==
Socolow was born in New York City to Adolfo Socolow and Sarah Mindich Socolow on November 11, 1928. As a child he was nicknamed "Sandy," the name which he would come to use throughout his life. The family soon moved to a farm in Connecticut but was forced to return to New York City during the Depression. Sanford Socolow graduated from Stuyvesant High School and matriculated at Baruch College, but left Baruch for City College of New York following his freshman year. At CCNY Socolow majored in history and was named editor-in-chief of The Campus in 1949. Graduating in 1950, Socolow went to work as a copy boy at The New York Times but was soon drafted into the Army.

== Military experience ==
Socolow attended officer candidate school at Fort Sill, Oklahoma, where he trained as a forward artillery observer, graduating June 3, 1952. He received psychological warfare training at Fort Bragg, North Carolina, and as a second lieutenant was sent to Japan where he worked with a broadcast propaganda unit during the Korean War. Following the war and his honorable discharge, Socolow joined the International News Service in Tokyo. He covered Asia as a wire service reporter before returning to the United States in 1955 .

== Early television ==
Socolow was hired as a writer on the WABD news program Mike Wallace and the News in 1956. Working with Ted Yates, Jr., Marlene Sanders, Bill Kobin and Mike Wallace, the team put together the first live local news broadcast for New York City's channel 5. The sponsor was Bond Clothes, and Wallace would read commercials for Bond Clothes inserted directly between news items. Socolow soon left WABD when he was hired by CBS News.

== Career at CBS News ==
Socolow joined CBS News to work on the morning news in 1956. Shortly thereafter he began working with Walter Cronkite on a midday news program and later Eyewitness to History, a series of news specials that evolved into a weekly prime-time program. He sat by Cronkite's side on election night 1960, silently passing notes on camara throughout the entire twelve hour close vote marathon. He then moved to the "CBS Evening News" when Douglas Edwards anchored and the broadcast was still 15-minutes. Socolow spent the academic year of 1961-1962 at Columbia University on a CBS Foundation News Fellowship, rejoining the "CBS Evening News" shortly after Cronkite replaced Edwards. Throughout much of the 1960s, Socolow, working under Don Hewitt, Ernie Leiser, and Les Midgley, played a key role in shaping Cronkite's daily newscast.

In 1974 Socolow moved to Washington, where he oversaw CBS’s coverage of Nixon’s resignation and the trials of the Watergate conspirators. He returned to New York in 1978 as executive producer of the CBS Evening News with Walter Cronkite and briefly continued on the program after Dan Rather succeeded Cronkite in 1981. He was later London Bureau Chief and a Producer for 60 Minutes.

== Later television career ==
After leaving CBS in 1988, Socolow developed the Christian Science Monitor program World Monitor and produced programs for the Discovery Channel, including Cronkite Reports, and for PBS.

== Personal life ==
Socolow was married for 17 years to Anne G. Krulewitch, daughter of major general Melvin Krulewitch, and divorced in 1977. He had three children including Michael J. Socolow.
