= Michael J. Socolow =

American scholar and journalist

- Born: December 19, 1968 (age 57)
- Relatives: Melvin Krulewitch (grandfather); Sanford Socolow (father)

Academic background
- Education: Columbia University (BA); Georgetown University (PhD)

Academic work
- Discipline: Journalism
- Institutions: University of Maine

Michael J. Socolow (born December 19, 1968) is an American media historian and former broadcast journalist who teaches in the Department of Communication and Journalism at the University of Maine.

== Background and education ==
He was raised in Washington, D.C., and New York City, and graduated from Phillips Exeter Academy in 1987. He earned his bachelor's degree at Columbia University in 1991, and was awarded his doctorate in history from Georgetown University in 2001. He has taught at Brandeis University and the University of Maine.

== Journalism ==
Socolow worked on the assignment desk in the Los Angeles bureau of the Cable News Network (CNN), where he became an assignment editor in 1994. He worked on stories such as the O.J. Simpson trial, the first Michael Jackson molestation trial, and the 1994 Northridge earthquake, for which the CNN Los Angeles Bureau was awarded a Cable Ace Award for Extended News or Breaking News coverage in 1995.

He also worked as an information manager for the host broadcast organizations at the 1992 Barcelona, 1996 Atlanta, and 2000 Sydney Olympic Games.

Socolow has written op-eds, essays, and commentary for the New York Times, Washington Post, Boston Globe, Chicago Tribune, Slate, Politico, The Conversation, and numerous other publications.

== Scholarship and academic career ==
Socolow, often working in collaboration with Jefferson Pooley, has written several articles (both scholarly and popular) dispelling the myth of The War of the Worlds (1938 radio drama) mass panic. Their collaborative work argues that the panic was "almost non-existent" and significantly overstated by contemporaneous sensational press reporting, and, later, in academic scholarship. In a 2013 interview with Gizmodo, Socolow denied the idea that he and Pooley originated this mass panic revisionism, citing at least four previous scholars who arrived at the same conclusion about the mass panic being largely a myth. Yet Pooley and Socolow's scholarship has been cited by Snopes, Time, National Geographic, and others to dispel the "War of the Worlds," mass panic myth.

In 2010, in Journalism & Mass Communication Quarterly, Socolow published a history of the New York Times Op-ed page that explained how the Op-ed concept came in to being and detailed the new feature's immediate success. His research on Op-ed has been cited in journalism scholarship and referenced in The Washington Post, the Columbia Journalism Review, Politico, and elsewhere.

Socolow's 2016 book, Six Minutes in Berlin: Broadcast Spectacle and Rowing Gold at the Nazi Olympics, chronicles how the German government invented global broadcast spectacle by developing new radio relay technologies. The book uses one specific Olympic triumph as a case study of the new effects of global Olympic broadcasting: the victory of the University of Washington eight-oared crew. The book also shows how, ironically, the Nazi government made Jesse Owens one of the world's first global athletic superstars. In 2018, Socolow was awarded the Broadcast Historian award by the Library of American Broadcasting Foundation and the Broadcast Education Association for Six Minutes in Berlin.

Socolow was a Fulbright Research Scholar at the News & Media Research Centre at the University of Canberra, in Australia, in 2019.

In July, 2020, Socolow was named the Director of the McGillicuddy Humanities Center at the University of Maine.

== Personal life ==
Socolow is married to Connie A. McVey, and lives in Bangor, Maine. He is the grandson of U.S. Marine Corps Major General Melvin Krulewitch, and the son of Anne K. Socolow and Sanford Socolow, the executive producer of the CBS Evening News with Walter Cronkite.
