= Sokolow =

As a surname, Sokolow may refer to:

- Nahum Sokolow (1859-1936), Jewish Hebrew language writer and Zionist leader
- Americans:
  - Anna Sokolow (1910 – 2000), dancer and choreographer
  - Tobi Sokolow (born 1942), bridge player
  - Fred Sokolow (born 1945), string musician
  - Alec Sokolow (born 1963), screenwriter
  - Deb Sokolow (born 1974), artist
  - Julie Sokolow (born 1987), film director, musician, and writer

== See also ==
- Sokolov (disambiguation)
- Socolow
- Sokoloff
