= Hans G. Adler =

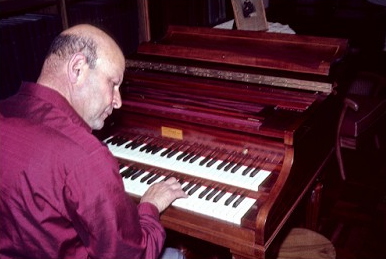
- Hans Adler performing on his modern Pleyel harpsichord
- Born: 25 February 1904; Germany
- Died: 1 February 1979 (aged 74); South Africa

Hans Georg Adler (25 February 1904 – 1 February 1979) was a German musicologist, collector, and classical music promoter in South Africa.

== Early life (1904–1933) ==
Adler was born in Germany, into a family interested and involved in classical music. His mother, Johanna Nathan, was a professional soprano and performed for noted composers such as Brahms, Tchaikovsky, Busoni, and the singer Julius Stockhausen, who was her tutor. Adler studied Law and Musicology at the Frankfurt and Berlin universities, and studied piano and harpisichord at the Hoch Conservatory, under the tutelage of Prof. Eduard Jung. Adler left Nazi Germany for South Africa in 1933. There he was employed by a hardware wholesaler, and frequently performed keyboard works on air with the South African Broadcasting Corporation (SABC).

== Southern Africa (1933–1978) ==
Over the course of his career in South Africa, Hans Adler was committed to the collection of rare instruments and classical music works, and the promotion of visiting classical musicians in the country, creating a lasting impact on the growth of classical music in South Africa.

In 1952, he become the vice-chairman of the Johannesburg Music Society (South Africa's oldest musical society, a registered non-profit organisation), and later become chairman 1955 until 1969. In 1969, Adler became honorary chairman for the society. The Johannesburg Music Society was among the first to invite international classical music artists and groups to perform in South Africa. As such, Johannesburg soon became the centre of the performers' broad African tours. These tours included the large cities of South Africa (Pretoria, Durban, East London, Cape Town, Port Elizabeth), as well as visits to Kenya, the former Northern and Southern Rhodesia, Mozambique, the islands of Mauritius and Reunion, the former South West Africa, Angola and sometimes the former Belgian Congo. Many of these tours included the creation of recordings with the SABC.

Under Hans Adler's lead, the Johannesburg Music Society increased the promotion of classical music, and encouraged international musicians to perform for audiences in South Africa. In turn, this allowed classical music in South Africa to expand and flourish during that time

For this achievement, and for the musical museum he created over the course of his career, an honorary doctorate from the University of the Witwatersrand was conferred on him in 1978.

== Collection and museum ==
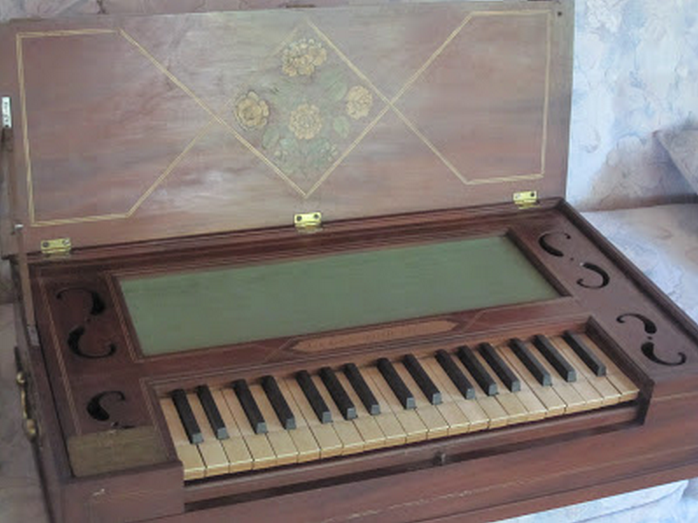
Glass harmonics by Beyer, 1786, one of only four thought to be extant

After World War II, Hans Adler began expanding the small library inherited from his father. Amongst others, his additions included classical music dictionaries, encyclopedias, manuscripts, complete composer compendiums, in many different languages. The library also included volumes of music scores. Moreover, he acquired early keyboard instruments – a clavicytherium, clavichords, a glass harmonica, an octave spinet, harpsichords, a fortepiano and two modern Steinway grand pianos. The collection eventually comprised 19 instruments, and provided a demonstration of the development of the piano. Along with the keyboard instruments, was a viola d'amore.

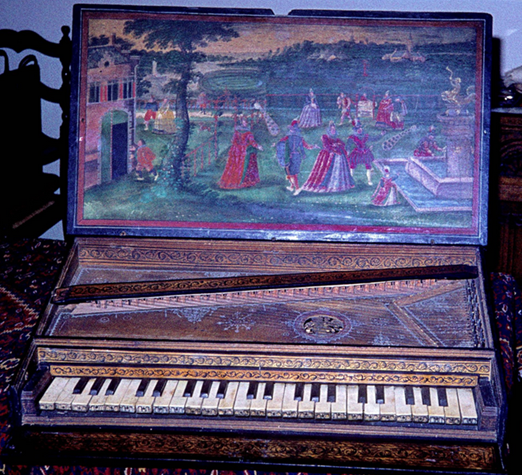
Virginal by Andreas Ruckers, c1610

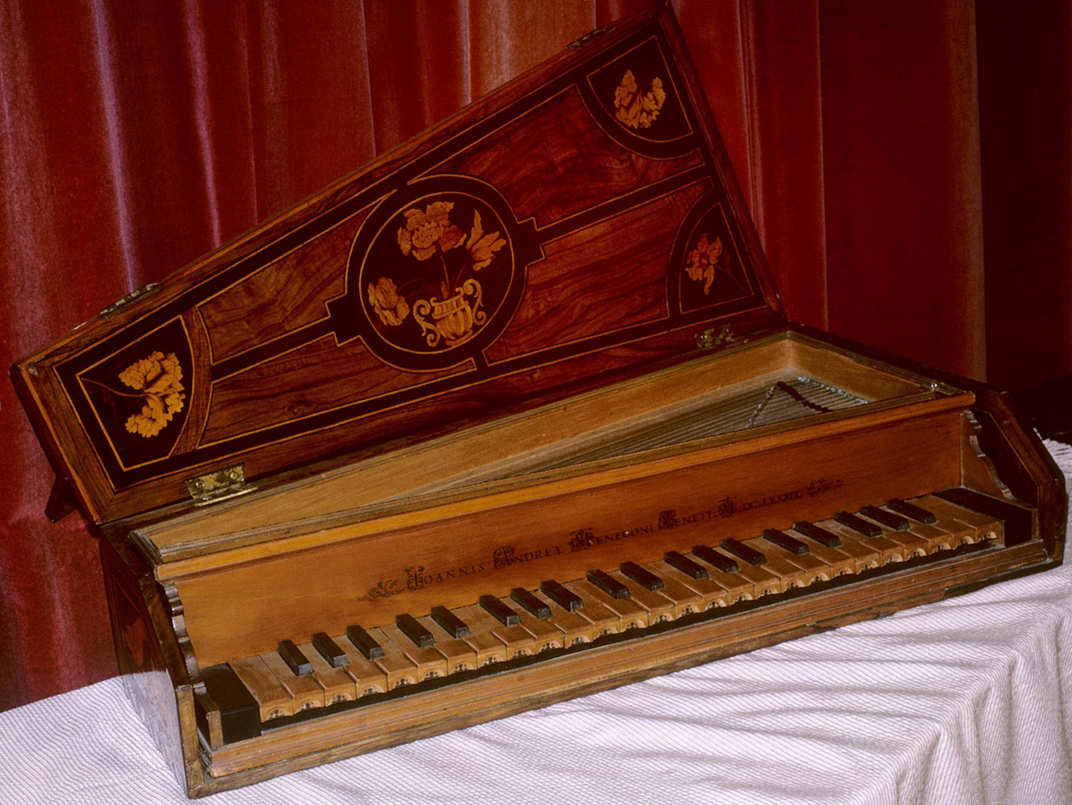
The collection's 1689 Menegoni octave spinet, one of only two known

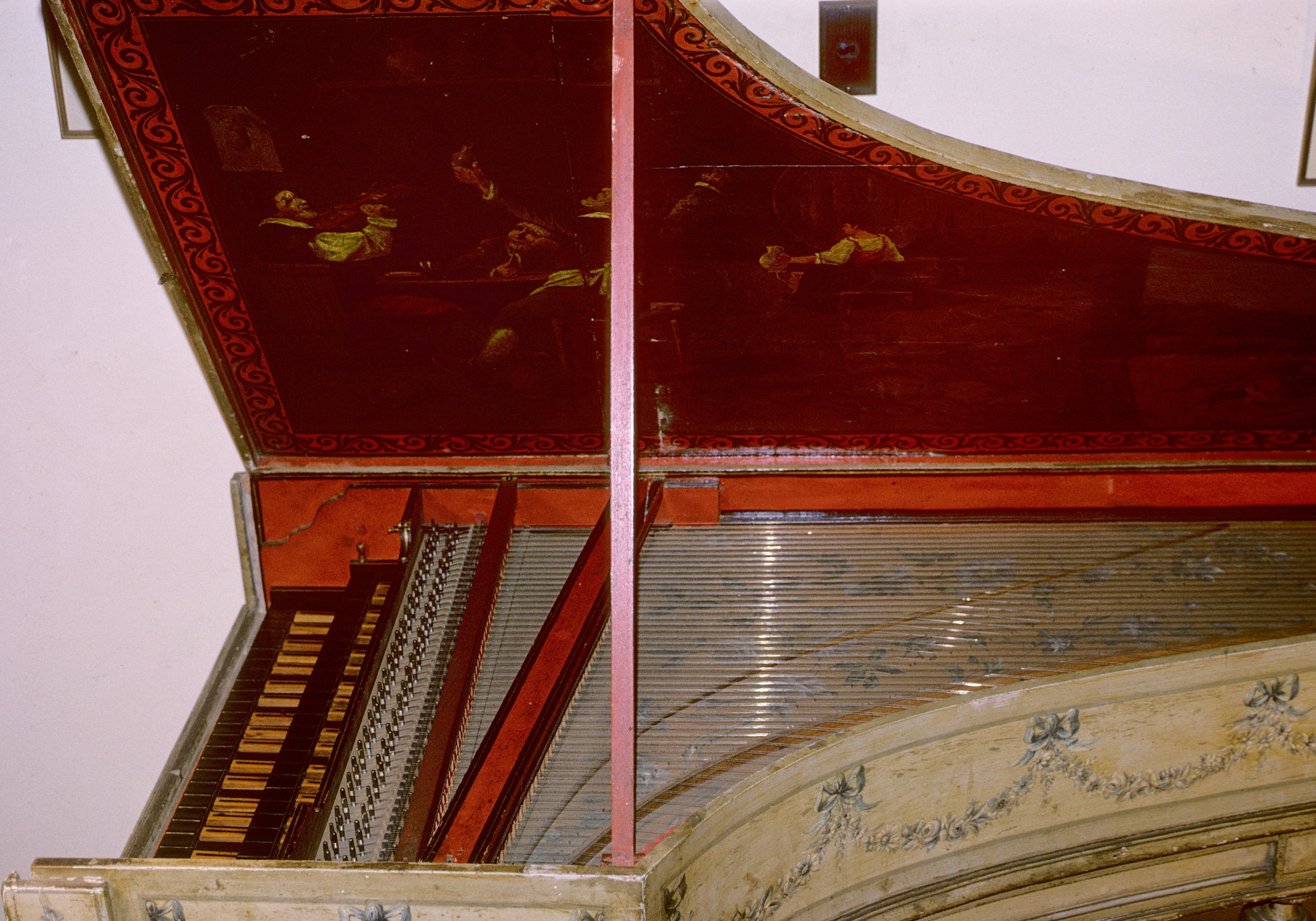
The collection's 1750 Italian two-manual harpsichord

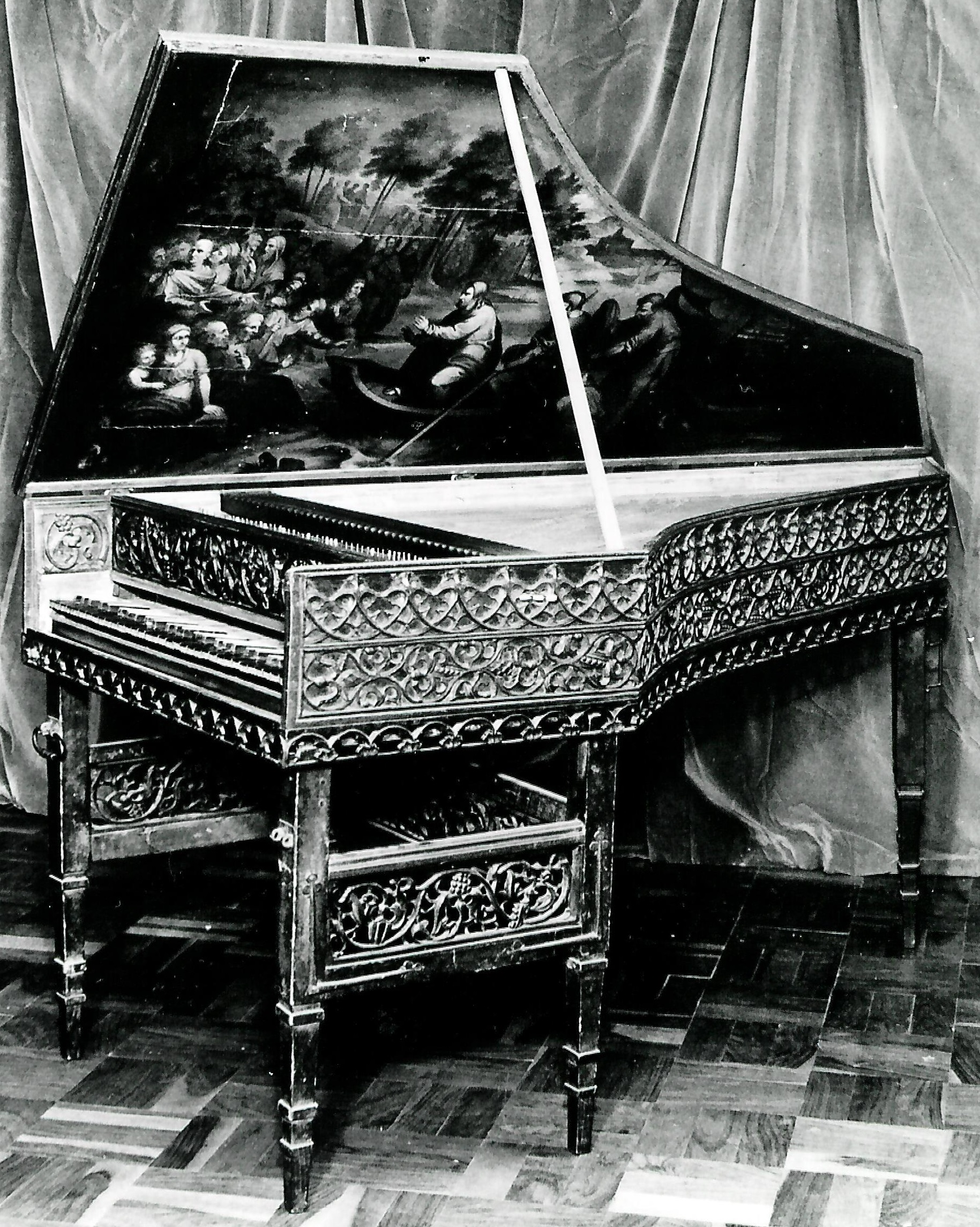
The ex-Wanda Landowska 16th-century gothic harpsichord

Over time, this personal library grew into a sizable collection, especially in keyboard compositions and productions. Together with the instrument collection, this evolved into a museum, which was housed in his Johannesburg home. One highlight included a "showcase of rare and unusual items of intrigue to musicians and musicologists." Tours for university students were sometimes conducted, and the SABC periodically aired early composers' works at the museum, which Adler would perform - often together with touring overseas performers - on the antique keyboard instruments.

The museum was considered by some of the musicologists of the time to be one of the more outstanding museums of this nature in private hands. It was eventually willed to the University of the Witwatersrand in Johannesburg, who opened a "Hans Adler Memorial Museum" in their Arts Building in 1980. For the museum opening, a Hans Adler Memorial Volume book, "A Collection of Tributes" was published.

Between 1954 and 1978, most of the classical musicians and groups touring Southern Africa were invited by Adler to browse in the library and try out the instruments. A number of the touring musicians also discovered interesting or little-known works, though this exchange (See note 7 in: examples of unusual works referenced).

=== Notable instruments ===
The collection housed a variety of historical instruments. The principle instruments in the collection are as follows:

- 17th century upright Italian clavicytherium
- early 17th century two-manual Italian harpsichord
- single keyboard harpsichord, built by Ferdinandus Weber, 1750
- virginal built by Joannis Veneti, 1689
- early 18th century clavichord
- 18th century fortepiano, built by Goerg Winkler
- Glass harmonica, built by Beyer, 1786

=== Unusual works ===
- In 1959, Adler donated one of his two rare copies of Frontispice by Ravel to the British Museum, which did not possess the work before that point. At the time, the work was unknown, as Ravel had violated his publisher's sole publishing rights when it appeared in the popular Paris magazine Feuillets d'art in 1919.

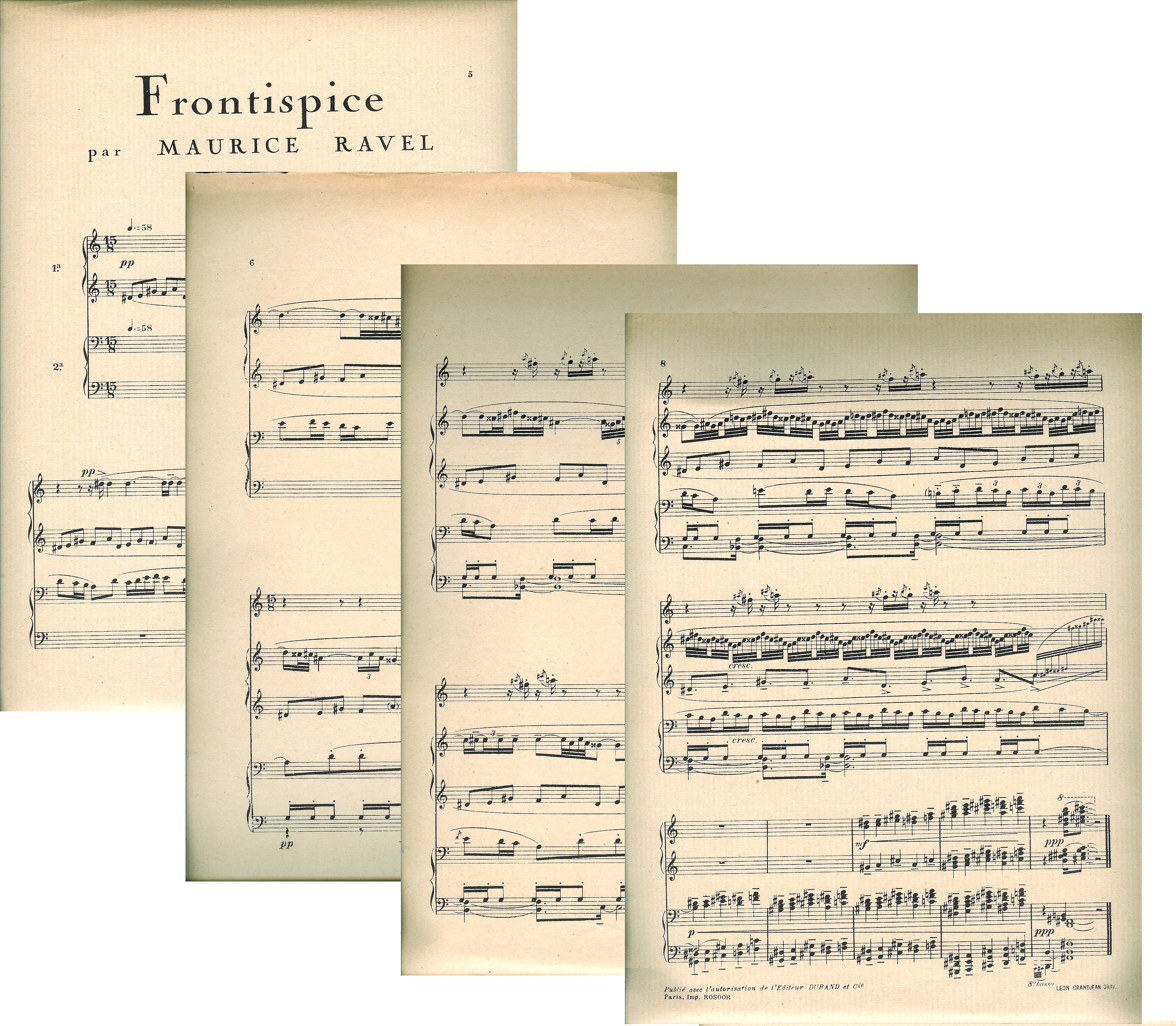
The collection's Frontispice by Ravel, published in 1919, then withdrawn due to copyright infringements, and officially published after WW2

- Adler allegedly collected evidence of a 6th piano concerto of Beethoven's, and two other piano concertos that may be attributed to him.
- A violin and piano sonata with two movements by Robert Schumann, one by Brahms and one by Albert Dietrich, in honour of Joseph Joachim
- A Schumann quartet for 4 horns and piano
- A Schumann andante and variations for two pianos, two cellos and French horn, long out of print, as Schumann rearranged it for two pianos alone
- Variations on a Russian theme, written by Artciboucheff, Wihtol, Liadov, Rimsky-Korsakoff, Sokolow and Alexander Glazunov
- An original string orchestra serenade by Josef Suk
- Leopold Mozart's first edition (1756) of a violin method
- A 1492 Incunabula by Boetius. Treatise: Arithmetica Geometria et Musica Boetii

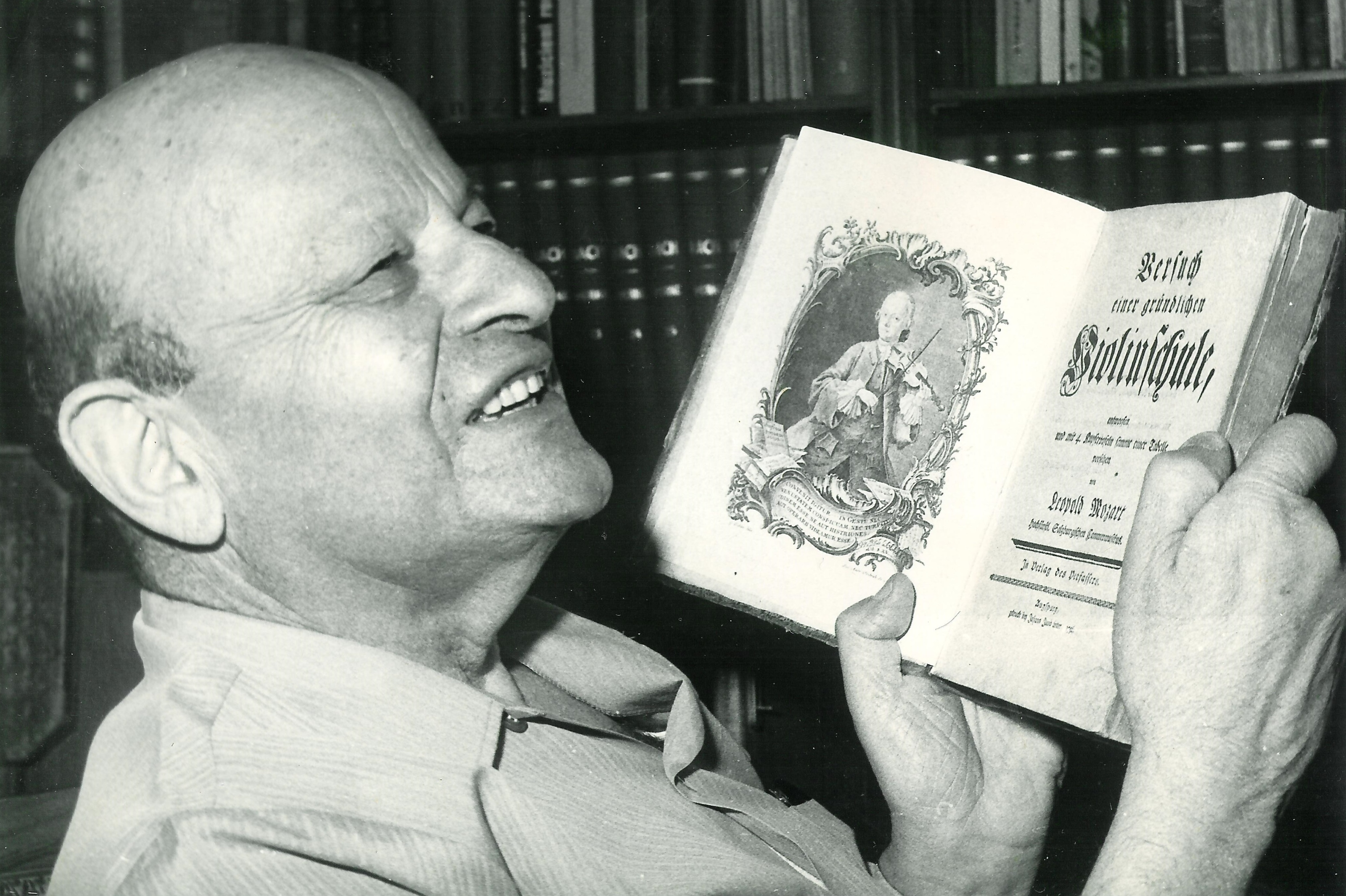
Hans Adler's 1st edition copy of Leopold Mozart's Versuch einer gründlichen Violinschule

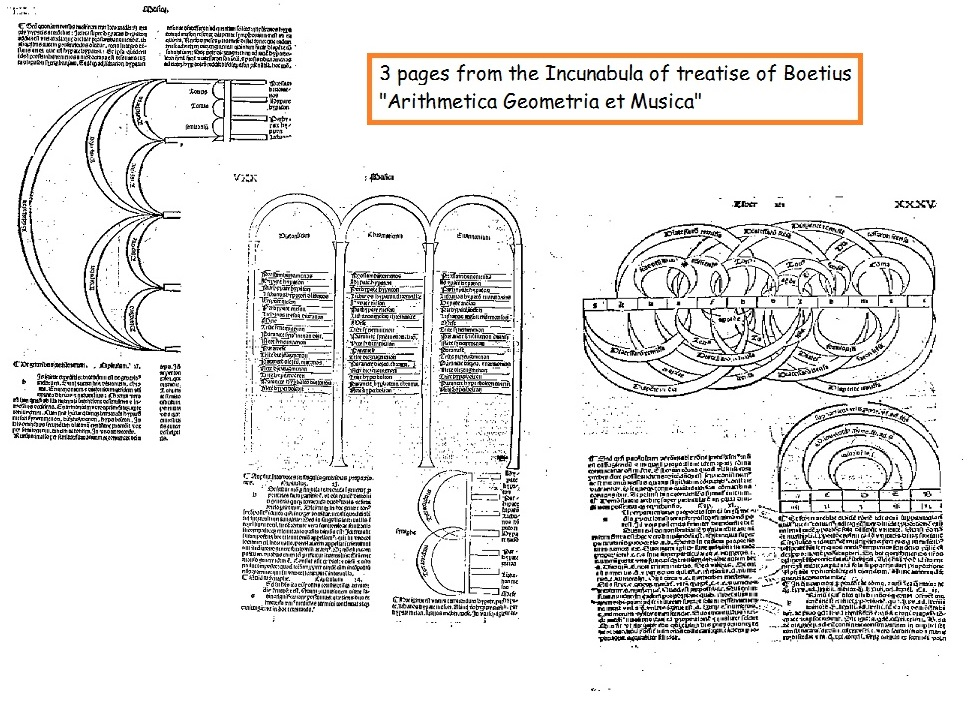
Three pages from the collection's 1492 Incunabula - Treatise on Arithmetic, Geometry and Music, by Boetius

- Borodin's almost forgotten piano quintet
- A signed, numbered copy of Karlheinz Stockhausen's "Skizzen und Manuskripte" and one of Detlef Kieffer's "3 Pieces Breves" donated to him when they toured South Africa
- A composition for him by John Ogdon and another by Julian Dawson-Lyell.
- Information and some photographs of the above examples can be seen on the H.A. "showcase of rare and unusual works" site.
- Adler also donated, to South African composer/conductor/SABC Head of Music Gideon Fagan, a rare copy of Vol 1. of "The Edwin Fleischer Music Collection" for which Fagan had been searching for a decade.
- Discoveries of unusual cello works by local cello enthusiast/journalist, Joe Sack, which he passed on to other professionals. These included works such as:
  - Theme and Variations on a Purcell Motif by von Weber
  - The Rheinberger cello sonatas
  - a little-known concerto by Charles-Valentin Alkan

=== Other items ===
The collection housed over 125 touring musicians' dedicated photographs, recital programs and music-room comments during their Southern Africa tours. These musicians include:

- Salvatore Accardo (Italian violinist/conductor; 3 Southern Africa tours)
- Elly Ameling (Dutch Soprano; 2 Southern Africa tours)
- Paul Badura-Skoda and Eva Badura-Skoda (Austrian Pianist and Musicologist/Librarian Duo)
- Malcolm Binns (British Pianist; 2 Southern Africa tours)
- Gaspar Cassado (Spanish Cellist; 3 Southern Africa tours)
- Enrica Cavallo/Franco Gulli (Italian Violin-Piano Duo; 2 Southern Africa tours)
- Shura Cherkassky (Russian Pianist; 3 Southern Africa tours)
- Alicia De Larrocha (Spanish Pianist; 4 Southern Africa tours)
- Joerg Demus (Austrian Pianist)
- James Galway (Irish flautist)
- Heinz Holliger (Swiss Oboist)
- Hungarian Quartet
- Koeckert Quartet (repeated tours among the many noted ensembles who visited)
- Loewenguth Quartet
- John Ogdon (English Pianist; 4 Southern Africa tours)
- Siegfried Palm (German Cellist; 2 Southern Africa tours)
- Edith Peinemann (German Violinist; 5 Southern Africa tours)
- Jean-Pierre Rampal (French flautist; 3 Southern Africa tours)
- Hans Richter-Haaser (German Pianist; 4 Southern Africa tours)
- Aaron Rosand (American violinist; 3 Southern Africa tours)
- Volker Schmidt-Gertenbach (German Conductor)
- Ruth Slenczynska (American Pianist; 2 Southern Africa tours)
- Gerard Souzay (French Baritone; 3 Southern Africa tours)
- Karlheinz Stockhausen (Modern German Composer)
- Maria Stader (Austro-Hungarian soprano)
- Sergio Varella-Cid (Portuguese Pianist)
- Julian Lloyd Webber (British cellist)

== References and Bibliography ==
- Hans Adler, A Collection of Tributes. ISBN 0854946217 https://hansadlercollection.blogspot.com/2012/12/hans-adler-biography.html
- Hans Adler's Collection of Music Instruments. https://hansadlercollection.blogspot.com/
- Collection of Rare and Unusual items on Display at the Wits Museum including a Boethius 15th Century Incunabula and a curious story of Ravel's Fronticepiece. https://rareclassicalmusicexhibits.blogspot.com/
- The Hans Adler memorial Museum at Wits University, South Africa. https://hansadlercollection.blogspot.com/2012/12/the-hans-adler-music-museum-at.html
- Celebrated and Acclaimed Musicians and Musical Groups Hans Adler brought to tour South Africa. https://classicalmusicianstoza.blogspot.com/
- Dedicated Autograph books from these artists. https://hansadlercollection.blogspot.com/2023/10/three-autograph-books-with-musicians.html
- Interesting Newspaper and magazine Clippings on all the above. https://hansadlermusic-mediainfo.blogspot.com/
- Radio (SABC) interview and a few of the radio 4 hand recordings. https://hansadlerradiotranscripts.blogspot.com/
