= Melvin Krulewitch =

United States Marine Corps general

Melvin Levin Krulewitch (11 November 1895 – 25 May 1978) was a major general of the United States Marine Corps Reserve who saw active service in both world wars and the Korean War.

== Early years ==
Melvin Krulewitch was born on 11 November 1895 in Manhattan, New York City. His parents, Anne & Harry Krulewitch, were Jewish. He received a Bachelor of Arts degree from Columbia University in 1916, enlisted as a private in the United States Marine Corps after his graduation, and went on to serve in the 1st Battalion 6th Marines during the First World War. His battalion was sent to France in late 1917, where they underwent intensive training for trench warfare from French and British instructors, and were transferred to the frontline in spring 1918, by which point Krulewitch held the rank of sergeant.

In a BBC interview for The Great War in 1964, he recalled his experiences at the Battle of Belleau Wood in June 1918:

The difficulty with Belleau Wood was you never knew where the front was. Little groups of Americans, little groups of Germans got together to fight each other. And while you were fighting in one direction all of a sudden, without any warning, you'd find there were some Germans to the rear of you and they had to be mopped up. Clean up, mop up, and move ahead; move ahead with the unyielding determination to enforce your will on the enemy; and that was how we moved in Belleau Wood.

Krulewitch's unit later participated in the Meuse-Argonne Offensive and by the night of 10 November 1918, they had crossed the Meuse river and made an attack on the opposite bank. However, the marines had suffered heavy losses and when Krulewitch collected the survivors of his unit together, he found that he only had 11 men remaining out of a company of over 200.

== Interwar period ==
Returning to the United States in 1919, Krulewitch resumed his law studies and was admitted to the New York Bar in 1920. In addition to working as a public-utilities attorney, he was commissioned as a second lieutenant in the Marine reserves in 1927, and played a key role in establishing and maintaining the Marine Corps Reserve Unit in New York, with its headquarters being run from his law office.

== World War II ==
During World War II, Krulewitch held the rank of lieutenant colonel and served with the 4th Marine Division in the Asiatic-Pacific Theater. Between 1942 and 1944, his unit saw action at the battles of Tulagi and Gavutu–Tanambogo, Saipan, Tinian and Roi-Namur Island. In March 1945, during the Battle of Iwo Jima, Krulewitch commanded the 4th Provisional Battalion, which was responsible for attacking bypassed Japanese positions.

== Later life ==
After serving in the Korean War, Krulewitch was promoted to brigadier general in 1955. He retired from the Marine Corps Reserve in 1956, with the rank of major general.

The following year, he campaigned as a Republican candidate for the Borough president of Manhattan, but was unsuccessful. In January 1959, Governor Nelson Rockefeller appointed Krulewitch the chairman of the New York State Athletic Commission. Following the death of Benny Paret in 1962, Krulewitch cautioned against the outlawing of boxing, and said, "If it went underground, it would have all the evils attending an unsupervised sport." He retired from the Athletic Commission in 1967, but continued to practice law for the remainder of his life.

Krulewitch died in his Manhattan apartment on 25 May 1978, at the age of 82. He was survived by his second wife, two children, a stepson and seven grandchildren.

== Military awards ==
Krulewitch was awarded the following military decorations and awards:

Navy Presidential Unit Citation	Navy Unit Commendation	World War I Victory Medal	American Defense Service Medal
American Campaign Medal	Asiatic–Pacific Campaign Medal	World War II Victory Medal	National Defense Service Medal
Korean Service Medal	Bronze Star Medal	Republic of Korea Presidential Unit Citation	United Nations Korea Medal
